

141001–141100 

|-bgcolor=#E9E9E9
| 141001 ||  || — || November 17, 2001 || Socorro || LINEAR || PAD || align=right | 3.2 km || 
|-id=002 bgcolor=#d6d6d6
| 141002 ||  || — || November 17, 2001 || Socorro || LINEAR || — || align=right | 8.2 km || 
|-id=003 bgcolor=#d6d6d6
| 141003 ||  || — || November 17, 2001 || Socorro || LINEAR || — || align=right | 3.6 km || 
|-id=004 bgcolor=#d6d6d6
| 141004 ||  || — || November 17, 2001 || Socorro || LINEAR || EOS || align=right | 3.4 km || 
|-id=005 bgcolor=#d6d6d6
| 141005 ||  || — || November 17, 2001 || Socorro || LINEAR || KOR || align=right | 2.7 km || 
|-id=006 bgcolor=#E9E9E9
| 141006 ||  || — || November 17, 2001 || Socorro || LINEAR || — || align=right | 2.3 km || 
|-id=007 bgcolor=#d6d6d6
| 141007 ||  || — || November 17, 2001 || Socorro || LINEAR || — || align=right | 3.6 km || 
|-id=008 bgcolor=#E9E9E9
| 141008 ||  || — || November 17, 2001 || Socorro || LINEAR || — || align=right | 2.3 km || 
|-id=009 bgcolor=#d6d6d6
| 141009 ||  || — || November 17, 2001 || Socorro || LINEAR || TEL || align=right | 2.9 km || 
|-id=010 bgcolor=#d6d6d6
| 141010 ||  || — || November 17, 2001 || Socorro || LINEAR || — || align=right | 4.3 km || 
|-id=011 bgcolor=#d6d6d6
| 141011 ||  || — || November 17, 2001 || Socorro || LINEAR || — || align=right | 5.2 km || 
|-id=012 bgcolor=#d6d6d6
| 141012 ||  || — || November 18, 2001 || Socorro || LINEAR || KOR || align=right | 2.1 km || 
|-id=013 bgcolor=#d6d6d6
| 141013 ||  || — || November 18, 2001 || Socorro || LINEAR || — || align=right | 5.8 km || 
|-id=014 bgcolor=#d6d6d6
| 141014 ||  || — || November 18, 2001 || Socorro || LINEAR || — || align=right | 3.2 km || 
|-id=015 bgcolor=#d6d6d6
| 141015 ||  || — || November 18, 2001 || Socorro || LINEAR || TEL || align=right | 2.2 km || 
|-id=016 bgcolor=#d6d6d6
| 141016 ||  || — || November 19, 2001 || Socorro || LINEAR || THM || align=right | 5.2 km || 
|-id=017 bgcolor=#d6d6d6
| 141017 ||  || — || November 19, 2001 || Socorro || LINEAR || — || align=right | 4.2 km || 
|-id=018 bgcolor=#FFC2E0
| 141018 ||  || — || November 20, 2001 || Socorro || LINEAR || AMO || align=right data-sort-value="0.59" | 590 m || 
|-id=019 bgcolor=#E9E9E9
| 141019 ||  || — || November 19, 2001 || Anderson Mesa || LONEOS || — || align=right | 2.3 km || 
|-id=020 bgcolor=#E9E9E9
| 141020 ||  || — || November 18, 2001 || Socorro || LINEAR || — || align=right | 4.5 km || 
|-id=021 bgcolor=#d6d6d6
| 141021 ||  || — || November 19, 2001 || Socorro || LINEAR || KOR || align=right | 2.5 km || 
|-id=022 bgcolor=#d6d6d6
| 141022 ||  || — || November 19, 2001 || Socorro || LINEAR || — || align=right | 3.8 km || 
|-id=023 bgcolor=#d6d6d6
| 141023 ||  || — || November 19, 2001 || Socorro || LINEAR || KOR || align=right | 2.1 km || 
|-id=024 bgcolor=#d6d6d6
| 141024 ||  || — || November 19, 2001 || Socorro || LINEAR || — || align=right | 5.6 km || 
|-id=025 bgcolor=#d6d6d6
| 141025 ||  || — || November 19, 2001 || Socorro || LINEAR || TIR || align=right | 5.4 km || 
|-id=026 bgcolor=#E9E9E9
| 141026 ||  || — || November 19, 2001 || Socorro || LINEAR || — || align=right | 3.5 km || 
|-id=027 bgcolor=#d6d6d6
| 141027 ||  || — || November 19, 2001 || Socorro || LINEAR || — || align=right | 4.1 km || 
|-id=028 bgcolor=#E9E9E9
| 141028 ||  || — || November 19, 2001 || Socorro || LINEAR || — || align=right | 3.6 km || 
|-id=029 bgcolor=#d6d6d6
| 141029 ||  || — || November 19, 2001 || Socorro || LINEAR || KOR || align=right | 1.9 km || 
|-id=030 bgcolor=#d6d6d6
| 141030 ||  || — || November 19, 2001 || Socorro || LINEAR || — || align=right | 6.9 km || 
|-id=031 bgcolor=#d6d6d6
| 141031 ||  || — || November 19, 2001 || Socorro || LINEAR || — || align=right | 4.4 km || 
|-id=032 bgcolor=#d6d6d6
| 141032 ||  || — || November 19, 2001 || Socorro || LINEAR || — || align=right | 6.4 km || 
|-id=033 bgcolor=#d6d6d6
| 141033 ||  || — || November 19, 2001 || Socorro || LINEAR || — || align=right | 3.6 km || 
|-id=034 bgcolor=#d6d6d6
| 141034 ||  || — || November 20, 2001 || Socorro || LINEAR || — || align=right | 3.4 km || 
|-id=035 bgcolor=#d6d6d6
| 141035 ||  || — || November 20, 2001 || Socorro || LINEAR || HYG || align=right | 4.0 km || 
|-id=036 bgcolor=#d6d6d6
| 141036 ||  || — || November 20, 2001 || Socorro || LINEAR || — || align=right | 3.5 km || 
|-id=037 bgcolor=#d6d6d6
| 141037 ||  || — || November 20, 2001 || Socorro || LINEAR || — || align=right | 4.5 km || 
|-id=038 bgcolor=#d6d6d6
| 141038 ||  || — || November 20, 2001 || Socorro || LINEAR || — || align=right | 3.8 km || 
|-id=039 bgcolor=#d6d6d6
| 141039 ||  || — || November 20, 2001 || Socorro || LINEAR || — || align=right | 3.3 km || 
|-id=040 bgcolor=#d6d6d6
| 141040 ||  || — || November 20, 2001 || Socorro || LINEAR || EOS || align=right | 3.3 km || 
|-id=041 bgcolor=#d6d6d6
| 141041 ||  || — || November 20, 2001 || Socorro || LINEAR || — || align=right | 3.5 km || 
|-id=042 bgcolor=#d6d6d6
| 141042 ||  || — || November 20, 2001 || Socorro || LINEAR || — || align=right | 5.5 km || 
|-id=043 bgcolor=#d6d6d6
| 141043 ||  || — || November 20, 2001 || Socorro || LINEAR || HYG || align=right | 4.6 km || 
|-id=044 bgcolor=#d6d6d6
| 141044 ||  || — || November 20, 2001 || Socorro || LINEAR || — || align=right | 3.4 km || 
|-id=045 bgcolor=#d6d6d6
| 141045 ||  || — || November 20, 2001 || Socorro || LINEAR || — || align=right | 4.1 km || 
|-id=046 bgcolor=#d6d6d6
| 141046 ||  || — || November 20, 2001 || Socorro || LINEAR || LIX || align=right | 6.0 km || 
|-id=047 bgcolor=#E9E9E9
| 141047 ||  || — || November 21, 2001 || Socorro || LINEAR || — || align=right | 3.9 km || 
|-id=048 bgcolor=#d6d6d6
| 141048 ||  || — || November 21, 2001 || Socorro || LINEAR || HYG || align=right | 5.7 km || 
|-id=049 bgcolor=#d6d6d6
| 141049 ||  || — || November 18, 2001 || Socorro || LINEAR || — || align=right | 5.8 km || 
|-id=050 bgcolor=#d6d6d6
| 141050 ||  || — || November 18, 2001 || Socorro || LINEAR || — || align=right | 5.1 km || 
|-id=051 bgcolor=#d6d6d6
| 141051 ||  || — || November 18, 2001 || Kitt Peak || Spacewatch || THM || align=right | 4.1 km || 
|-id=052 bgcolor=#FFC2E0
| 141052 ||  || — || December 9, 2001 || Socorro || LINEAR || APO +1km || align=right | 1.2 km || 
|-id=053 bgcolor=#FFC2E0
| 141053 ||  || — || December 9, 2001 || Socorro || LINEAR || APOPHA || align=right data-sort-value="0.62" | 620 m || 
|-id=054 bgcolor=#fefefe
| 141054 ||  || — || December 8, 2001 || Socorro || LINEAR || H || align=right | 1.2 km || 
|-id=055 bgcolor=#fefefe
| 141055 ||  || — || December 9, 2001 || Socorro || LINEAR || H || align=right | 1.2 km || 
|-id=056 bgcolor=#FFC2E0
| 141056 ||  || — || December 9, 2001 || Socorro || LINEAR || APO +1km || align=right | 1.3 km || 
|-id=057 bgcolor=#d6d6d6
| 141057 ||  || — || December 7, 2001 || Socorro || LINEAR || — || align=right | 5.4 km || 
|-id=058 bgcolor=#d6d6d6
| 141058 ||  || — || December 7, 2001 || Socorro || LINEAR || THM || align=right | 4.5 km || 
|-id=059 bgcolor=#d6d6d6
| 141059 ||  || — || December 8, 2001 || Socorro || LINEAR || — || align=right | 4.7 km || 
|-id=060 bgcolor=#d6d6d6
| 141060 ||  || — || December 7, 2001 || Socorro || LINEAR || TRP || align=right | 5.0 km || 
|-id=061 bgcolor=#d6d6d6
| 141061 ||  || — || December 9, 2001 || Socorro || LINEAR || HYG || align=right | 5.1 km || 
|-id=062 bgcolor=#d6d6d6
| 141062 ||  || — || December 10, 2001 || Kitt Peak || Spacewatch || — || align=right | 3.2 km || 
|-id=063 bgcolor=#d6d6d6
| 141063 ||  || — || December 9, 2001 || Socorro || LINEAR || — || align=right | 6.2 km || 
|-id=064 bgcolor=#fefefe
| 141064 ||  || — || December 9, 2001 || Socorro || LINEAR || H || align=right | 1.5 km || 
|-id=065 bgcolor=#d6d6d6
| 141065 ||  || — || December 9, 2001 || Socorro || LINEAR || EOS || align=right | 3.1 km || 
|-id=066 bgcolor=#d6d6d6
| 141066 ||  || — || December 9, 2001 || Socorro || LINEAR || — || align=right | 5.8 km || 
|-id=067 bgcolor=#d6d6d6
| 141067 ||  || — || December 9, 2001 || Socorro || LINEAR || TEL || align=right | 2.8 km || 
|-id=068 bgcolor=#d6d6d6
| 141068 ||  || — || December 9, 2001 || Socorro || LINEAR || ALA || align=right | 8.1 km || 
|-id=069 bgcolor=#d6d6d6
| 141069 ||  || — || December 9, 2001 || Socorro || LINEAR || — || align=right | 6.4 km || 
|-id=070 bgcolor=#d6d6d6
| 141070 ||  || — || December 10, 2001 || Socorro || LINEAR || — || align=right | 7.1 km || 
|-id=071 bgcolor=#d6d6d6
| 141071 ||  || — || December 9, 2001 || Socorro || LINEAR || — || align=right | 7.5 km || 
|-id=072 bgcolor=#d6d6d6
| 141072 ||  || — || December 9, 2001 || Socorro || LINEAR || — || align=right | 6.0 km || 
|-id=073 bgcolor=#E9E9E9
| 141073 ||  || — || December 9, 2001 || Socorro || LINEAR || DOR || align=right | 4.2 km || 
|-id=074 bgcolor=#d6d6d6
| 141074 ||  || — || December 9, 2001 || Socorro || LINEAR || — || align=right | 7.1 km || 
|-id=075 bgcolor=#d6d6d6
| 141075 ||  || — || December 9, 2001 || Socorro || LINEAR || EOS || align=right | 3.9 km || 
|-id=076 bgcolor=#d6d6d6
| 141076 ||  || — || December 10, 2001 || Socorro || LINEAR || YAK || align=right | 6.5 km || 
|-id=077 bgcolor=#d6d6d6
| 141077 ||  || — || December 10, 2001 || Socorro || LINEAR || — || align=right | 5.7 km || 
|-id=078 bgcolor=#FFC2E0
| 141078 ||  || — || December 11, 2001 || Socorro || LINEAR || AMO || align=right data-sort-value="0.62" | 620 m || 
|-id=079 bgcolor=#FFC2E0
| 141079 ||  || — || December 11, 2001 || Socorro || LINEAR || APO +1km || align=right | 1.0 km || 
|-id=080 bgcolor=#d6d6d6
| 141080 ||  || — || December 7, 2001 || Socorro || LINEAR || EOS || align=right | 3.2 km || 
|-id=081 bgcolor=#d6d6d6
| 141081 ||  || — || December 9, 2001 || Socorro || LINEAR || EOS || align=right | 3.3 km || 
|-id=082 bgcolor=#d6d6d6
| 141082 ||  || — || December 9, 2001 || Socorro || LINEAR || — || align=right | 5.5 km || 
|-id=083 bgcolor=#d6d6d6
| 141083 ||  || — || December 13, 2001 || Palomar || NEAT || EOS || align=right | 3.6 km || 
|-id=084 bgcolor=#d6d6d6
| 141084 ||  || — || December 9, 2001 || Socorro || LINEAR || — || align=right | 5.8 km || 
|-id=085 bgcolor=#d6d6d6
| 141085 ||  || — || December 9, 2001 || Socorro || LINEAR || — || align=right | 5.6 km || 
|-id=086 bgcolor=#d6d6d6
| 141086 ||  || — || December 9, 2001 || Socorro || LINEAR || EOS || align=right | 3.5 km || 
|-id=087 bgcolor=#d6d6d6
| 141087 ||  || — || December 9, 2001 || Socorro || LINEAR || — || align=right | 5.5 km || 
|-id=088 bgcolor=#d6d6d6
| 141088 ||  || — || December 9, 2001 || Socorro || LINEAR || ALA || align=right | 6.2 km || 
|-id=089 bgcolor=#d6d6d6
| 141089 ||  || — || December 9, 2001 || Socorro || LINEAR || — || align=right | 5.4 km || 
|-id=090 bgcolor=#d6d6d6
| 141090 ||  || — || December 9, 2001 || Socorro || LINEAR || — || align=right | 8.6 km || 
|-id=091 bgcolor=#d6d6d6
| 141091 ||  || — || December 9, 2001 || Socorro || LINEAR || EUP || align=right | 6.6 km || 
|-id=092 bgcolor=#d6d6d6
| 141092 ||  || — || December 9, 2001 || Socorro || LINEAR || — || align=right | 5.1 km || 
|-id=093 bgcolor=#d6d6d6
| 141093 ||  || — || December 9, 2001 || Socorro || LINEAR || — || align=right | 4.5 km || 
|-id=094 bgcolor=#d6d6d6
| 141094 ||  || — || December 9, 2001 || Socorro || LINEAR || VER || align=right | 6.2 km || 
|-id=095 bgcolor=#d6d6d6
| 141095 ||  || — || December 9, 2001 || Socorro || LINEAR || — || align=right | 8.1 km || 
|-id=096 bgcolor=#fefefe
| 141096 ||  || — || December 9, 2001 || Socorro || LINEAR || H || align=right | 1.5 km || 
|-id=097 bgcolor=#d6d6d6
| 141097 ||  || — || December 10, 2001 || Socorro || LINEAR || URS || align=right | 6.8 km || 
|-id=098 bgcolor=#d6d6d6
| 141098 ||  || — || December 10, 2001 || Socorro || LINEAR || — || align=right | 5.7 km || 
|-id=099 bgcolor=#d6d6d6
| 141099 ||  || — || December 10, 2001 || Socorro || LINEAR || — || align=right | 4.6 km || 
|-id=100 bgcolor=#d6d6d6
| 141100 ||  || — || December 10, 2001 || Socorro || LINEAR || — || align=right | 5.1 km || 
|}

141101–141200 

|-bgcolor=#d6d6d6
| 141101 ||  || — || December 10, 2001 || Socorro || LINEAR || — || align=right | 5.2 km || 
|-id=102 bgcolor=#d6d6d6
| 141102 ||  || — || December 10, 2001 || Socorro || LINEAR || KOR || align=right | 2.7 km || 
|-id=103 bgcolor=#d6d6d6
| 141103 ||  || — || December 10, 2001 || Socorro || LINEAR || — || align=right | 3.9 km || 
|-id=104 bgcolor=#d6d6d6
| 141104 ||  || — || December 10, 2001 || Socorro || LINEAR || THM || align=right | 4.4 km || 
|-id=105 bgcolor=#d6d6d6
| 141105 ||  || — || December 10, 2001 || Socorro || LINEAR || — || align=right | 6.7 km || 
|-id=106 bgcolor=#d6d6d6
| 141106 ||  || — || December 10, 2001 || Socorro || LINEAR || — || align=right | 7.7 km || 
|-id=107 bgcolor=#d6d6d6
| 141107 ||  || — || December 10, 2001 || Socorro || LINEAR || — || align=right | 5.4 km || 
|-id=108 bgcolor=#d6d6d6
| 141108 ||  || — || December 10, 2001 || Socorro || LINEAR || THM || align=right | 4.5 km || 
|-id=109 bgcolor=#d6d6d6
| 141109 ||  || — || December 10, 2001 || Socorro || LINEAR || — || align=right | 5.5 km || 
|-id=110 bgcolor=#d6d6d6
| 141110 ||  || — || December 10, 2001 || Socorro || LINEAR || — || align=right | 4.9 km || 
|-id=111 bgcolor=#d6d6d6
| 141111 ||  || — || December 10, 2001 || Socorro || LINEAR || — || align=right | 5.0 km || 
|-id=112 bgcolor=#d6d6d6
| 141112 ||  || — || December 10, 2001 || Socorro || LINEAR || — || align=right | 4.8 km || 
|-id=113 bgcolor=#d6d6d6
| 141113 ||  || — || December 11, 2001 || Socorro || LINEAR || — || align=right | 3.8 km || 
|-id=114 bgcolor=#E9E9E9
| 141114 ||  || — || December 11, 2001 || Socorro || LINEAR || — || align=right | 5.1 km || 
|-id=115 bgcolor=#d6d6d6
| 141115 ||  || — || December 11, 2001 || Socorro || LINEAR || — || align=right | 4.7 km || 
|-id=116 bgcolor=#E9E9E9
| 141116 ||  || — || December 11, 2001 || Socorro || LINEAR || MRX || align=right | 2.0 km || 
|-id=117 bgcolor=#d6d6d6
| 141117 ||  || — || December 11, 2001 || Socorro || LINEAR || — || align=right | 5.4 km || 
|-id=118 bgcolor=#d6d6d6
| 141118 ||  || — || December 11, 2001 || Socorro || LINEAR || — || align=right | 4.9 km || 
|-id=119 bgcolor=#d6d6d6
| 141119 ||  || — || December 11, 2001 || Socorro || LINEAR || — || align=right | 4.9 km || 
|-id=120 bgcolor=#E9E9E9
| 141120 ||  || — || December 11, 2001 || Socorro || LINEAR || HEN || align=right | 2.0 km || 
|-id=121 bgcolor=#d6d6d6
| 141121 ||  || — || December 11, 2001 || Socorro || LINEAR || — || align=right | 3.4 km || 
|-id=122 bgcolor=#d6d6d6
| 141122 ||  || — || December 11, 2001 || Socorro || LINEAR || — || align=right | 6.1 km || 
|-id=123 bgcolor=#E9E9E9
| 141123 ||  || — || December 11, 2001 || Socorro || LINEAR || HEN || align=right | 1.7 km || 
|-id=124 bgcolor=#fefefe
| 141124 ||  || — || December 11, 2001 || Socorro || LINEAR || FLO || align=right | 1.3 km || 
|-id=125 bgcolor=#d6d6d6
| 141125 ||  || — || December 11, 2001 || Socorro || LINEAR || TIR || align=right | 5.3 km || 
|-id=126 bgcolor=#d6d6d6
| 141126 ||  || — || December 11, 2001 || Socorro || LINEAR || HYG || align=right | 4.9 km || 
|-id=127 bgcolor=#d6d6d6
| 141127 ||  || — || December 11, 2001 || Socorro || LINEAR || — || align=right | 6.0 km || 
|-id=128 bgcolor=#d6d6d6
| 141128 Ghyoot ||  ||  || December 10, 2001 || Uccle || T. Pauwels || HYG || align=right | 4.5 km || 
|-id=129 bgcolor=#d6d6d6
| 141129 ||  || — || December 10, 2001 || Socorro || LINEAR || — || align=right | 7.0 km || 
|-id=130 bgcolor=#d6d6d6
| 141130 ||  || — || December 10, 2001 || Socorro || LINEAR || — || align=right | 5.2 km || 
|-id=131 bgcolor=#fefefe
| 141131 ||  || — || December 10, 2001 || Socorro || LINEAR || V || align=right | 1.1 km || 
|-id=132 bgcolor=#d6d6d6
| 141132 ||  || — || December 10, 2001 || Socorro || LINEAR || — || align=right | 5.8 km || 
|-id=133 bgcolor=#d6d6d6
| 141133 ||  || — || December 10, 2001 || Socorro || LINEAR || EOS || align=right | 3.1 km || 
|-id=134 bgcolor=#d6d6d6
| 141134 ||  || — || December 10, 2001 || Socorro || LINEAR || THM || align=right | 5.1 km || 
|-id=135 bgcolor=#d6d6d6
| 141135 ||  || — || December 10, 2001 || Socorro || LINEAR || URS || align=right | 6.1 km || 
|-id=136 bgcolor=#d6d6d6
| 141136 ||  || — || December 10, 2001 || Socorro || LINEAR || — || align=right | 4.7 km || 
|-id=137 bgcolor=#d6d6d6
| 141137 ||  || — || December 10, 2001 || Socorro || LINEAR || EOS || align=right | 3.3 km || 
|-id=138 bgcolor=#d6d6d6
| 141138 ||  || — || December 10, 2001 || Socorro || LINEAR || — || align=right | 5.8 km || 
|-id=139 bgcolor=#d6d6d6
| 141139 ||  || — || December 10, 2001 || Socorro || LINEAR || THM || align=right | 5.1 km || 
|-id=140 bgcolor=#d6d6d6
| 141140 ||  || — || December 10, 2001 || Socorro || LINEAR || — || align=right | 4.1 km || 
|-id=141 bgcolor=#d6d6d6
| 141141 ||  || — || December 10, 2001 || Socorro || LINEAR || EOS || align=right | 4.0 km || 
|-id=142 bgcolor=#E9E9E9
| 141142 ||  || — || December 10, 2001 || Socorro || LINEAR || HNS || align=right | 2.9 km || 
|-id=143 bgcolor=#d6d6d6
| 141143 ||  || — || December 10, 2001 || Socorro || LINEAR || EOS || align=right | 3.5 km || 
|-id=144 bgcolor=#d6d6d6
| 141144 ||  || — || December 10, 2001 || Socorro || LINEAR || HYG || align=right | 6.2 km || 
|-id=145 bgcolor=#d6d6d6
| 141145 ||  || — || December 14, 2001 || Kitt Peak || Spacewatch || THM || align=right | 3.6 km || 
|-id=146 bgcolor=#d6d6d6
| 141146 ||  || — || December 10, 2001 || Socorro || LINEAR || URS || align=right | 4.8 km || 
|-id=147 bgcolor=#E9E9E9
| 141147 ||  || — || December 10, 2001 || Socorro || LINEAR || — || align=right | 3.9 km || 
|-id=148 bgcolor=#d6d6d6
| 141148 ||  || — || December 10, 2001 || Socorro || LINEAR || — || align=right | 3.7 km || 
|-id=149 bgcolor=#d6d6d6
| 141149 ||  || — || December 10, 2001 || Socorro || LINEAR || HYG || align=right | 5.5 km || 
|-id=150 bgcolor=#d6d6d6
| 141150 ||  || — || December 11, 2001 || Socorro || LINEAR || EOS || align=right | 3.5 km || 
|-id=151 bgcolor=#d6d6d6
| 141151 ||  || — || December 11, 2001 || Socorro || LINEAR || — || align=right | 5.2 km || 
|-id=152 bgcolor=#d6d6d6
| 141152 ||  || — || December 11, 2001 || Socorro || LINEAR || URS || align=right | 6.6 km || 
|-id=153 bgcolor=#d6d6d6
| 141153 ||  || — || December 11, 2001 || Socorro || LINEAR || — || align=right | 3.6 km || 
|-id=154 bgcolor=#d6d6d6
| 141154 ||  || — || December 13, 2001 || Socorro || LINEAR || TIR || align=right | 4.2 km || 
|-id=155 bgcolor=#d6d6d6
| 141155 ||  || — || December 13, 2001 || Socorro || LINEAR || — || align=right | 5.1 km || 
|-id=156 bgcolor=#d6d6d6
| 141156 ||  || — || December 13, 2001 || Socorro || LINEAR || HYG || align=right | 3.8 km || 
|-id=157 bgcolor=#d6d6d6
| 141157 ||  || — || December 14, 2001 || Socorro || LINEAR || — || align=right | 4.2 km || 
|-id=158 bgcolor=#d6d6d6
| 141158 ||  || — || December 14, 2001 || Socorro || LINEAR || THM || align=right | 5.4 km || 
|-id=159 bgcolor=#d6d6d6
| 141159 ||  || — || December 14, 2001 || Socorro || LINEAR || — || align=right | 3.7 km || 
|-id=160 bgcolor=#d6d6d6
| 141160 ||  || — || December 14, 2001 || Socorro || LINEAR || — || align=right | 4.6 km || 
|-id=161 bgcolor=#d6d6d6
| 141161 ||  || — || December 14, 2001 || Socorro || LINEAR || THM || align=right | 3.9 km || 
|-id=162 bgcolor=#d6d6d6
| 141162 ||  || — || December 14, 2001 || Socorro || LINEAR || THM || align=right | 4.4 km || 
|-id=163 bgcolor=#d6d6d6
| 141163 ||  || — || December 14, 2001 || Socorro || LINEAR || — || align=right | 3.9 km || 
|-id=164 bgcolor=#d6d6d6
| 141164 ||  || — || December 14, 2001 || Socorro || LINEAR || — || align=right | 4.1 km || 
|-id=165 bgcolor=#d6d6d6
| 141165 ||  || — || December 14, 2001 || Socorro || LINEAR || — || align=right | 5.3 km || 
|-id=166 bgcolor=#d6d6d6
| 141166 ||  || — || December 14, 2001 || Socorro || LINEAR || — || align=right | 3.7 km || 
|-id=167 bgcolor=#d6d6d6
| 141167 ||  || — || December 14, 2001 || Socorro || LINEAR || HYG || align=right | 5.1 km || 
|-id=168 bgcolor=#E9E9E9
| 141168 ||  || — || December 14, 2001 || Socorro || LINEAR || MRX || align=right | 1.8 km || 
|-id=169 bgcolor=#d6d6d6
| 141169 ||  || — || December 14, 2001 || Socorro || LINEAR || HYG || align=right | 5.2 km || 
|-id=170 bgcolor=#d6d6d6
| 141170 ||  || — || December 14, 2001 || Socorro || LINEAR || — || align=right | 3.3 km || 
|-id=171 bgcolor=#d6d6d6
| 141171 ||  || — || December 14, 2001 || Socorro || LINEAR || — || align=right | 3.9 km || 
|-id=172 bgcolor=#d6d6d6
| 141172 ||  || — || December 14, 2001 || Socorro || LINEAR || — || align=right | 4.2 km || 
|-id=173 bgcolor=#E9E9E9
| 141173 ||  || — || December 14, 2001 || Socorro || LINEAR || HEN || align=right | 2.0 km || 
|-id=174 bgcolor=#d6d6d6
| 141174 ||  || — || December 14, 2001 || Socorro || LINEAR || — || align=right | 4.4 km || 
|-id=175 bgcolor=#d6d6d6
| 141175 ||  || — || December 14, 2001 || Socorro || LINEAR || HYG || align=right | 4.0 km || 
|-id=176 bgcolor=#d6d6d6
| 141176 ||  || — || December 14, 2001 || Socorro || LINEAR || CHA || align=right | 3.8 km || 
|-id=177 bgcolor=#d6d6d6
| 141177 ||  || — || December 14, 2001 || Socorro || LINEAR || — || align=right | 6.8 km || 
|-id=178 bgcolor=#d6d6d6
| 141178 ||  || — || December 14, 2001 || Socorro || LINEAR || — || align=right | 5.9 km || 
|-id=179 bgcolor=#d6d6d6
| 141179 ||  || — || December 14, 2001 || Socorro || LINEAR || EOS || align=right | 3.8 km || 
|-id=180 bgcolor=#d6d6d6
| 141180 ||  || — || December 14, 2001 || Socorro || LINEAR || TIR || align=right | 7.8 km || 
|-id=181 bgcolor=#d6d6d6
| 141181 ||  || — || December 14, 2001 || Socorro || LINEAR || THM || align=right | 4.9 km || 
|-id=182 bgcolor=#d6d6d6
| 141182 ||  || — || December 14, 2001 || Socorro || LINEAR || HYG || align=right | 6.4 km || 
|-id=183 bgcolor=#d6d6d6
| 141183 ||  || — || December 14, 2001 || Socorro || LINEAR || — || align=right | 3.6 km || 
|-id=184 bgcolor=#d6d6d6
| 141184 ||  || — || December 14, 2001 || Socorro || LINEAR || HYG || align=right | 5.5 km || 
|-id=185 bgcolor=#E9E9E9
| 141185 ||  || — || December 14, 2001 || Socorro || LINEAR || HNA || align=right | 4.2 km || 
|-id=186 bgcolor=#d6d6d6
| 141186 ||  || — || December 14, 2001 || Socorro || LINEAR || — || align=right | 4.2 km || 
|-id=187 bgcolor=#d6d6d6
| 141187 ||  || — || December 14, 2001 || Socorro || LINEAR || — || align=right | 6.2 km || 
|-id=188 bgcolor=#d6d6d6
| 141188 ||  || — || December 14, 2001 || Socorro || LINEAR || — || align=right | 5.2 km || 
|-id=189 bgcolor=#d6d6d6
| 141189 ||  || — || December 14, 2001 || Socorro || LINEAR || VER || align=right | 5.6 km || 
|-id=190 bgcolor=#E9E9E9
| 141190 ||  || — || December 14, 2001 || Socorro || LINEAR || MRX || align=right | 2.1 km || 
|-id=191 bgcolor=#d6d6d6
| 141191 ||  || — || December 14, 2001 || Socorro || LINEAR || — || align=right | 5.2 km || 
|-id=192 bgcolor=#d6d6d6
| 141192 ||  || — || December 14, 2001 || Socorro || LINEAR || — || align=right | 4.0 km || 
|-id=193 bgcolor=#d6d6d6
| 141193 ||  || — || December 14, 2001 || Socorro || LINEAR || — || align=right | 5.0 km || 
|-id=194 bgcolor=#d6d6d6
| 141194 ||  || — || December 14, 2001 || Socorro || LINEAR || — || align=right | 4.2 km || 
|-id=195 bgcolor=#d6d6d6
| 141195 ||  || — || December 14, 2001 || Socorro || LINEAR || HYG || align=right | 4.1 km || 
|-id=196 bgcolor=#d6d6d6
| 141196 ||  || — || December 14, 2001 || Socorro || LINEAR || — || align=right | 4.5 km || 
|-id=197 bgcolor=#E9E9E9
| 141197 ||  || — || December 14, 2001 || Socorro || LINEAR || HEN || align=right | 1.6 km || 
|-id=198 bgcolor=#E9E9E9
| 141198 ||  || — || December 14, 2001 || Socorro || LINEAR || — || align=right | 4.0 km || 
|-id=199 bgcolor=#E9E9E9
| 141199 ||  || — || December 11, 2001 || Socorro || LINEAR || — || align=right | 3.3 km || 
|-id=200 bgcolor=#d6d6d6
| 141200 ||  || — || December 11, 2001 || Socorro || LINEAR || SAN || align=right | 3.1 km || 
|}

141201–141300 

|-bgcolor=#d6d6d6
| 141201 ||  || — || December 11, 2001 || Socorro || LINEAR || — || align=right | 6.3 km || 
|-id=202 bgcolor=#d6d6d6
| 141202 ||  || — || December 11, 2001 || Socorro || LINEAR || — || align=right | 5.3 km || 
|-id=203 bgcolor=#d6d6d6
| 141203 ||  || — || December 11, 2001 || Socorro || LINEAR || — || align=right | 5.1 km || 
|-id=204 bgcolor=#E9E9E9
| 141204 ||  || — || December 11, 2001 || Socorro || LINEAR || PAD || align=right | 2.8 km || 
|-id=205 bgcolor=#d6d6d6
| 141205 ||  || — || December 11, 2001 || Socorro || LINEAR || EOS || align=right | 3.5 km || 
|-id=206 bgcolor=#d6d6d6
| 141206 ||  || — || December 11, 2001 || Socorro || LINEAR || — || align=right | 5.5 km || 
|-id=207 bgcolor=#E9E9E9
| 141207 ||  || — || December 11, 2001 || Socorro || LINEAR || — || align=right | 5.0 km || 
|-id=208 bgcolor=#d6d6d6
| 141208 ||  || — || December 11, 2001 || Socorro || LINEAR || — || align=right | 5.7 km || 
|-id=209 bgcolor=#d6d6d6
| 141209 ||  || — || December 11, 2001 || Socorro || LINEAR || — || align=right | 5.9 km || 
|-id=210 bgcolor=#d6d6d6
| 141210 ||  || — || December 11, 2001 || Socorro || LINEAR || EUP || align=right | 9.4 km || 
|-id=211 bgcolor=#d6d6d6
| 141211 ||  || — || December 15, 2001 || Socorro || LINEAR || — || align=right | 5.0 km || 
|-id=212 bgcolor=#d6d6d6
| 141212 ||  || — || December 15, 2001 || Socorro || LINEAR || — || align=right | 4.0 km || 
|-id=213 bgcolor=#d6d6d6
| 141213 ||  || — || December 15, 2001 || Socorro || LINEAR || — || align=right | 4.5 km || 
|-id=214 bgcolor=#d6d6d6
| 141214 ||  || — || December 15, 2001 || Socorro || LINEAR || KOR || align=right | 2.4 km || 
|-id=215 bgcolor=#d6d6d6
| 141215 ||  || — || December 15, 2001 || Socorro || LINEAR || — || align=right | 6.9 km || 
|-id=216 bgcolor=#d6d6d6
| 141216 ||  || — || December 15, 2001 || Socorro || LINEAR || EOS || align=right | 3.1 km || 
|-id=217 bgcolor=#d6d6d6
| 141217 ||  || — || December 15, 2001 || Socorro || LINEAR || — || align=right | 5.1 km || 
|-id=218 bgcolor=#d6d6d6
| 141218 ||  || — || December 15, 2001 || Socorro || LINEAR || — || align=right | 6.9 km || 
|-id=219 bgcolor=#E9E9E9
| 141219 ||  || — || December 15, 2001 || Socorro || LINEAR || — || align=right | 2.9 km || 
|-id=220 bgcolor=#E9E9E9
| 141220 ||  || — || December 15, 2001 || Socorro || LINEAR || WIT || align=right | 2.0 km || 
|-id=221 bgcolor=#d6d6d6
| 141221 ||  || — || December 15, 2001 || Socorro || LINEAR || — || align=right | 5.1 km || 
|-id=222 bgcolor=#d6d6d6
| 141222 ||  || — || December 15, 2001 || Socorro || LINEAR || — || align=right | 3.7 km || 
|-id=223 bgcolor=#d6d6d6
| 141223 ||  || — || December 15, 2001 || Socorro || LINEAR || — || align=right | 4.2 km || 
|-id=224 bgcolor=#d6d6d6
| 141224 ||  || — || December 15, 2001 || Socorro || LINEAR || — || align=right | 4.3 km || 
|-id=225 bgcolor=#d6d6d6
| 141225 ||  || — || December 15, 2001 || Socorro || LINEAR || HYG || align=right | 5.8 km || 
|-id=226 bgcolor=#d6d6d6
| 141226 ||  || — || December 15, 2001 || Socorro || LINEAR || THM || align=right | 3.7 km || 
|-id=227 bgcolor=#d6d6d6
| 141227 ||  || — || December 15, 2001 || Socorro || LINEAR || K-2 || align=right | 2.6 km || 
|-id=228 bgcolor=#d6d6d6
| 141228 ||  || — || December 15, 2001 || Socorro || LINEAR || HYG || align=right | 3.6 km || 
|-id=229 bgcolor=#d6d6d6
| 141229 ||  || — || December 15, 2001 || Socorro || LINEAR || HYG || align=right | 4.4 km || 
|-id=230 bgcolor=#d6d6d6
| 141230 ||  || — || December 15, 2001 || Socorro || LINEAR || — || align=right | 4.5 km || 
|-id=231 bgcolor=#d6d6d6
| 141231 ||  || — || December 15, 2001 || Socorro || LINEAR || — || align=right | 6.1 km || 
|-id=232 bgcolor=#E9E9E9
| 141232 ||  || — || December 15, 2001 || Socorro || LINEAR || — || align=right | 3.3 km || 
|-id=233 bgcolor=#d6d6d6
| 141233 ||  || — || December 15, 2001 || Socorro || LINEAR || — || align=right | 6.1 km || 
|-id=234 bgcolor=#d6d6d6
| 141234 ||  || — || December 15, 2001 || Socorro || LINEAR || — || align=right | 6.2 km || 
|-id=235 bgcolor=#d6d6d6
| 141235 ||  || — || December 15, 2001 || Socorro || LINEAR || — || align=right | 6.0 km || 
|-id=236 bgcolor=#d6d6d6
| 141236 ||  || — || December 13, 2001 || Palomar || NEAT || THM || align=right | 4.2 km || 
|-id=237 bgcolor=#d6d6d6
| 141237 ||  || — || December 14, 2001 || Socorro || LINEAR || — || align=right | 4.1 km || 
|-id=238 bgcolor=#d6d6d6
| 141238 ||  || — || December 14, 2001 || Socorro || LINEAR || HYG || align=right | 5.3 km || 
|-id=239 bgcolor=#d6d6d6
| 141239 ||  || — || December 14, 2001 || Socorro || LINEAR || — || align=right | 5.2 km || 
|-id=240 bgcolor=#d6d6d6
| 141240 ||  || — || December 14, 2001 || Socorro || LINEAR || THM || align=right | 3.6 km || 
|-id=241 bgcolor=#d6d6d6
| 141241 ||  || — || December 7, 2001 || Socorro || LINEAR || VER || align=right | 4.8 km || 
|-id=242 bgcolor=#d6d6d6
| 141242 ||  || — || December 7, 2001 || Palomar || NEAT || JLI || align=right | 6.5 km || 
|-id=243 bgcolor=#d6d6d6
| 141243 ||  || — || December 7, 2001 || Palomar || NEAT || — || align=right | 9.1 km || 
|-id=244 bgcolor=#d6d6d6
| 141244 ||  || — || December 8, 2001 || Anderson Mesa || LONEOS || MEL || align=right | 6.7 km || 
|-id=245 bgcolor=#d6d6d6
| 141245 ||  || — || December 9, 2001 || Anderson Mesa || LONEOS || URS || align=right | 4.6 km || 
|-id=246 bgcolor=#d6d6d6
| 141246 ||  || — || December 14, 2001 || Palomar || NEAT || EOS || align=right | 3.4 km || 
|-id=247 bgcolor=#d6d6d6
| 141247 ||  || — || December 14, 2001 || Anderson Mesa || LONEOS || JLI || align=right | 4.7 km || 
|-id=248 bgcolor=#d6d6d6
| 141248 ||  || — || December 9, 2001 || Socorro || LINEAR || — || align=right | 5.6 km || 
|-id=249 bgcolor=#d6d6d6
| 141249 ||  || — || December 17, 2001 || Cima Ekar || ADAS || — || align=right | 5.7 km || 
|-id=250 bgcolor=#d6d6d6
| 141250 ||  || — || December 20, 2001 || Cima Ekar || ADAS || — || align=right | 4.6 km || 
|-id=251 bgcolor=#d6d6d6
| 141251 ||  || — || December 17, 2001 || Socorro || LINEAR || — || align=right | 8.4 km || 
|-id=252 bgcolor=#d6d6d6
| 141252 ||  || — || December 17, 2001 || Socorro || LINEAR || LUT || align=right | 7.8 km || 
|-id=253 bgcolor=#d6d6d6
| 141253 ||  || — || December 17, 2001 || Socorro || LINEAR || — || align=right | 5.0 km || 
|-id=254 bgcolor=#d6d6d6
| 141254 ||  || — || December 17, 2001 || Socorro || LINEAR || — || align=right | 3.7 km || 
|-id=255 bgcolor=#d6d6d6
| 141255 ||  || — || December 17, 2001 || Socorro || LINEAR || KOR || align=right | 2.6 km || 
|-id=256 bgcolor=#d6d6d6
| 141256 ||  || — || December 17, 2001 || Socorro || LINEAR || TEL || align=right | 3.4 km || 
|-id=257 bgcolor=#d6d6d6
| 141257 ||  || — || December 18, 2001 || Socorro || LINEAR || KOR || align=right | 2.4 km || 
|-id=258 bgcolor=#d6d6d6
| 141258 ||  || — || December 18, 2001 || Socorro || LINEAR || — || align=right | 5.1 km || 
|-id=259 bgcolor=#d6d6d6
| 141259 ||  || — || December 18, 2001 || Socorro || LINEAR || — || align=right | 7.3 km || 
|-id=260 bgcolor=#d6d6d6
| 141260 ||  || — || December 18, 2001 || Socorro || LINEAR || — || align=right | 5.3 km || 
|-id=261 bgcolor=#d6d6d6
| 141261 ||  || — || December 18, 2001 || Socorro || LINEAR || VER || align=right | 4.4 km || 
|-id=262 bgcolor=#d6d6d6
| 141262 ||  || — || December 18, 2001 || Socorro || LINEAR || — || align=right | 4.3 km || 
|-id=263 bgcolor=#d6d6d6
| 141263 ||  || — || December 18, 2001 || Socorro || LINEAR || — || align=right | 5.0 km || 
|-id=264 bgcolor=#E9E9E9
| 141264 ||  || — || December 18, 2001 || Socorro || LINEAR || WIT || align=right | 1.9 km || 
|-id=265 bgcolor=#d6d6d6
| 141265 ||  || — || December 18, 2001 || Socorro || LINEAR || — || align=right | 5.9 km || 
|-id=266 bgcolor=#d6d6d6
| 141266 ||  || — || December 18, 2001 || Socorro || LINEAR || EOS || align=right | 3.3 km || 
|-id=267 bgcolor=#d6d6d6
| 141267 ||  || — || December 18, 2001 || Socorro || LINEAR || HYG || align=right | 5.0 km || 
|-id=268 bgcolor=#d6d6d6
| 141268 ||  || — || December 18, 2001 || Socorro || LINEAR || EOS || align=right | 3.8 km || 
|-id=269 bgcolor=#d6d6d6
| 141269 ||  || — || December 18, 2001 || Socorro || LINEAR || — || align=right | 4.6 km || 
|-id=270 bgcolor=#d6d6d6
| 141270 ||  || — || December 18, 2001 || Socorro || LINEAR || EOS || align=right | 3.0 km || 
|-id=271 bgcolor=#E9E9E9
| 141271 ||  || — || December 18, 2001 || Socorro || LINEAR || — || align=right | 2.9 km || 
|-id=272 bgcolor=#d6d6d6
| 141272 ||  || — || December 18, 2001 || Socorro || LINEAR || HYG || align=right | 4.5 km || 
|-id=273 bgcolor=#E9E9E9
| 141273 ||  || — || December 18, 2001 || Socorro || LINEAR || — || align=right | 3.9 km || 
|-id=274 bgcolor=#d6d6d6
| 141274 ||  || — || December 18, 2001 || Socorro || LINEAR || THM || align=right | 5.0 km || 
|-id=275 bgcolor=#d6d6d6
| 141275 ||  || — || December 18, 2001 || Socorro || LINEAR || — || align=right | 4.0 km || 
|-id=276 bgcolor=#E9E9E9
| 141276 ||  || — || December 18, 2001 || Socorro || LINEAR || XIZ || align=right | 2.6 km || 
|-id=277 bgcolor=#d6d6d6
| 141277 ||  || — || December 18, 2001 || Socorro || LINEAR || — || align=right | 5.1 km || 
|-id=278 bgcolor=#d6d6d6
| 141278 ||  || — || December 18, 2001 || Socorro || LINEAR || — || align=right | 4.5 km || 
|-id=279 bgcolor=#d6d6d6
| 141279 ||  || — || December 18, 2001 || Socorro || LINEAR || THM || align=right | 7.8 km || 
|-id=280 bgcolor=#d6d6d6
| 141280 ||  || — || December 18, 2001 || Socorro || LINEAR || — || align=right | 8.7 km || 
|-id=281 bgcolor=#d6d6d6
| 141281 ||  || — || December 18, 2001 || Socorro || LINEAR || — || align=right | 5.4 km || 
|-id=282 bgcolor=#d6d6d6
| 141282 ||  || — || December 18, 2001 || Socorro || LINEAR || — || align=right | 5.3 km || 
|-id=283 bgcolor=#d6d6d6
| 141283 ||  || — || December 18, 2001 || Socorro || LINEAR || — || align=right | 4.9 km || 
|-id=284 bgcolor=#d6d6d6
| 141284 ||  || — || December 18, 2001 || Socorro || LINEAR || CRO || align=right | 5.0 km || 
|-id=285 bgcolor=#d6d6d6
| 141285 ||  || — || December 18, 2001 || Socorro || LINEAR || THM || align=right | 3.7 km || 
|-id=286 bgcolor=#d6d6d6
| 141286 ||  || — || December 18, 2001 || Socorro || LINEAR || HYG || align=right | 6.4 km || 
|-id=287 bgcolor=#d6d6d6
| 141287 ||  || — || December 18, 2001 || Socorro || LINEAR || THM || align=right | 6.9 km || 
|-id=288 bgcolor=#d6d6d6
| 141288 ||  || — || December 18, 2001 || Socorro || LINEAR || — || align=right | 3.8 km || 
|-id=289 bgcolor=#E9E9E9
| 141289 ||  || — || December 18, 2001 || Socorro || LINEAR || — || align=right | 2.6 km || 
|-id=290 bgcolor=#d6d6d6
| 141290 ||  || — || December 18, 2001 || Socorro || LINEAR || — || align=right | 5.1 km || 
|-id=291 bgcolor=#d6d6d6
| 141291 ||  || — || December 18, 2001 || Socorro || LINEAR || — || align=right | 4.9 km || 
|-id=292 bgcolor=#d6d6d6
| 141292 ||  || — || December 18, 2001 || Socorro || LINEAR || — || align=right | 5.3 km || 
|-id=293 bgcolor=#d6d6d6
| 141293 ||  || — || December 18, 2001 || Socorro || LINEAR || HYG || align=right | 4.4 km || 
|-id=294 bgcolor=#d6d6d6
| 141294 ||  || — || December 18, 2001 || Socorro || LINEAR || — || align=right | 6.2 km || 
|-id=295 bgcolor=#d6d6d6
| 141295 ||  || — || December 17, 2001 || Palomar || NEAT || — || align=right | 4.8 km || 
|-id=296 bgcolor=#d6d6d6
| 141296 ||  || — || December 17, 2001 || Palomar || NEAT || HYG || align=right | 5.5 km || 
|-id=297 bgcolor=#fefefe
| 141297 ||  || — || December 17, 2001 || Anderson Mesa || LONEOS || H || align=right data-sort-value="0.95" | 950 m || 
|-id=298 bgcolor=#E9E9E9
| 141298 ||  || — || December 17, 2001 || Socorro || LINEAR || — || align=right | 3.5 km || 
|-id=299 bgcolor=#d6d6d6
| 141299 ||  || — || December 17, 2001 || Socorro || LINEAR || — || align=right | 6.6 km || 
|-id=300 bgcolor=#d6d6d6
| 141300 ||  || — || December 17, 2001 || Socorro || LINEAR || — || align=right | 5.4 km || 
|}

141301–141400 

|-bgcolor=#d6d6d6
| 141301 ||  || — || December 17, 2001 || Socorro || LINEAR || — || align=right | 5.6 km || 
|-id=302 bgcolor=#d6d6d6
| 141302 ||  || — || December 17, 2001 || Socorro || LINEAR || HYG || align=right | 8.6 km || 
|-id=303 bgcolor=#d6d6d6
| 141303 ||  || — || December 17, 2001 || Socorro || LINEAR || — || align=right | 5.2 km || 
|-id=304 bgcolor=#d6d6d6
| 141304 ||  || — || December 18, 2001 || Socorro || LINEAR || EOS || align=right | 4.2 km || 
|-id=305 bgcolor=#E9E9E9
| 141305 ||  || — || December 18, 2001 || Anderson Mesa || LONEOS || DOR || align=right | 5.2 km || 
|-id=306 bgcolor=#d6d6d6
| 141306 ||  || — || December 18, 2001 || Anderson Mesa || LONEOS || — || align=right | 6.1 km || 
|-id=307 bgcolor=#d6d6d6
| 141307 ||  || — || December 18, 2001 || Anderson Mesa || LONEOS || SYL7:4 || align=right | 8.1 km || 
|-id=308 bgcolor=#d6d6d6
| 141308 ||  || — || December 19, 2001 || Socorro || LINEAR || HYG || align=right | 5.3 km || 
|-id=309 bgcolor=#d6d6d6
| 141309 ||  || — || December 20, 2001 || Socorro || LINEAR || — || align=right | 6.4 km || 
|-id=310 bgcolor=#E9E9E9
| 141310 ||  || — || December 17, 2001 || Socorro || LINEAR || — || align=right | 2.4 km || 
|-id=311 bgcolor=#d6d6d6
| 141311 ||  || — || December 17, 2001 || Socorro || LINEAR || — || align=right | 8.9 km || 
|-id=312 bgcolor=#d6d6d6
| 141312 ||  || — || December 17, 2001 || Socorro || LINEAR || — || align=right | 6.2 km || 
|-id=313 bgcolor=#d6d6d6
| 141313 ||  || — || December 17, 2001 || Socorro || LINEAR || — || align=right | 5.9 km || 
|-id=314 bgcolor=#E9E9E9
| 141314 ||  || — || December 17, 2001 || Socorro || LINEAR || — || align=right | 4.4 km || 
|-id=315 bgcolor=#E9E9E9
| 141315 ||  || — || December 17, 2001 || Socorro || LINEAR || — || align=right | 2.5 km || 
|-id=316 bgcolor=#d6d6d6
| 141316 ||  || — || December 17, 2001 || Socorro || LINEAR || — || align=right | 6.3 km || 
|-id=317 bgcolor=#d6d6d6
| 141317 ||  || — || December 17, 2001 || Socorro || LINEAR || HYG || align=right | 5.7 km || 
|-id=318 bgcolor=#d6d6d6
| 141318 ||  || — || December 17, 2001 || Socorro || LINEAR || EUP || align=right | 8.5 km || 
|-id=319 bgcolor=#d6d6d6
| 141319 ||  || — || December 17, 2001 || Socorro || LINEAR || — || align=right | 7.1 km || 
|-id=320 bgcolor=#d6d6d6
| 141320 ||  || — || December 17, 2001 || Socorro || LINEAR || — || align=right | 5.1 km || 
|-id=321 bgcolor=#d6d6d6
| 141321 ||  || — || December 17, 2001 || Socorro || LINEAR || HYG || align=right | 3.9 km || 
|-id=322 bgcolor=#d6d6d6
| 141322 ||  || — || December 17, 2001 || Socorro || LINEAR || EOS || align=right | 3.4 km || 
|-id=323 bgcolor=#d6d6d6
| 141323 ||  || — || December 19, 2001 || Socorro || LINEAR || — || align=right | 6.0 km || 
|-id=324 bgcolor=#d6d6d6
| 141324 ||  || — || December 20, 2001 || Kitt Peak || Spacewatch || 7:4 || align=right | 5.5 km || 
|-id=325 bgcolor=#d6d6d6
| 141325 ||  || — || December 17, 2001 || Socorro || LINEAR || — || align=right | 6.6 km || 
|-id=326 bgcolor=#d6d6d6
| 141326 ||  || — || December 22, 2001 || Socorro || LINEAR || URS || align=right | 7.9 km || 
|-id=327 bgcolor=#E9E9E9
| 141327 ||  || — || December 22, 2001 || Socorro || LINEAR || — || align=right | 4.3 km || 
|-id=328 bgcolor=#d6d6d6
| 141328 ||  || — || December 20, 2001 || Palomar || NEAT || — || align=right | 4.7 km || 
|-id=329 bgcolor=#d6d6d6
| 141329 ||  || — || December 17, 2001 || Socorro || LINEAR || HYG || align=right | 4.7 km || 
|-id=330 bgcolor=#E9E9E9
| 141330 ||  || — || December 18, 2001 || Anderson Mesa || LONEOS || — || align=right | 4.3 km || 
|-id=331 bgcolor=#d6d6d6
| 141331 ||  || — || December 18, 2001 || Socorro || LINEAR || — || align=right | 4.3 km || 
|-id=332 bgcolor=#d6d6d6
| 141332 ||  || — || December 19, 2001 || Anderson Mesa || LONEOS || URS || align=right | 6.6 km || 
|-id=333 bgcolor=#d6d6d6
| 141333 ||  || — || December 19, 2001 || Anderson Mesa || LONEOS || — || align=right | 6.1 km || 
|-id=334 bgcolor=#d6d6d6
| 141334 ||  || — || December 19, 2001 || Socorro || LINEAR || — || align=right | 4.3 km || 
|-id=335 bgcolor=#d6d6d6
| 141335 ||  || — || December 20, 2001 || Palomar || NEAT || — || align=right | 6.3 km || 
|-id=336 bgcolor=#d6d6d6
| 141336 ||  || — || January 3, 2002 || Socorro || LINEAR || EUP || align=right | 8.5 km || 
|-id=337 bgcolor=#fefefe
| 141337 ||  || — || January 5, 2002 || Socorro || LINEAR || H || align=right data-sort-value="0.89" | 890 m || 
|-id=338 bgcolor=#fefefe
| 141338 ||  || — || January 6, 2002 || Socorro || LINEAR || H || align=right | 1.1 km || 
|-id=339 bgcolor=#fefefe
| 141339 ||  || — || January 5, 2002 || Cima Ekar || ADAS || H || align=right | 1.0 km || 
|-id=340 bgcolor=#d6d6d6
| 141340 ||  || — || January 8, 2002 || Oaxaca || J. M. Roe || — || align=right | 3.6 km || 
|-id=341 bgcolor=#d6d6d6
| 141341 ||  || — || January 9, 2002 || Cima Ekar || ADAS || — || align=right | 5.9 km || 
|-id=342 bgcolor=#d6d6d6
| 141342 ||  || — || January 11, 2002 || Desert Eagle || W. K. Y. Yeung || HYG || align=right | 5.3 km || 
|-id=343 bgcolor=#d6d6d6
| 141343 ||  || — || January 9, 2002 || Haleakala || NEAT || EUP || align=right | 6.0 km || 
|-id=344 bgcolor=#d6d6d6
| 141344 ||  || — || January 6, 2002 || Socorro || LINEAR || — || align=right | 6.4 km || 
|-id=345 bgcolor=#d6d6d6
| 141345 ||  || — || January 7, 2002 || Socorro || LINEAR || Tj (2.99) || align=right | 8.5 km || 
|-id=346 bgcolor=#d6d6d6
| 141346 ||  || — || January 4, 2002 || Haleakala || NEAT || — || align=right | 4.9 km || 
|-id=347 bgcolor=#d6d6d6
| 141347 ||  || — || January 8, 2002 || Needville || Needville Obs. || EUP || align=right | 6.3 km || 
|-id=348 bgcolor=#E9E9E9
| 141348 ||  || — || January 8, 2002 || Socorro || LINEAR || GEF || align=right | 2.3 km || 
|-id=349 bgcolor=#d6d6d6
| 141349 ||  || — || January 7, 2002 || Haleakala || NEAT || — || align=right | 5.1 km || 
|-id=350 bgcolor=#d6d6d6
| 141350 ||  || — || January 8, 2002 || Haleakala || NEAT || — || align=right | 4.2 km || 
|-id=351 bgcolor=#d6d6d6
| 141351 ||  || — || January 8, 2002 || Palomar || NEAT || HYG || align=right | 5.2 km || 
|-id=352 bgcolor=#d6d6d6
| 141352 ||  || — || January 14, 2002 || Desert Eagle || W. K. Y. Yeung || — || align=right | 6.4 km || 
|-id=353 bgcolor=#d6d6d6
| 141353 ||  || — || January 7, 2002 || Anderson Mesa || LONEOS || HYG || align=right | 5.3 km || 
|-id=354 bgcolor=#FFC2E0
| 141354 ||  || — || January 14, 2002 || Anderson Mesa || LONEOS || AMO +1km || align=right | 1.2 km || 
|-id=355 bgcolor=#E9E9E9
| 141355 ||  || — || January 8, 2002 || Socorro || LINEAR || EUN || align=right | 3.7 km || 
|-id=356 bgcolor=#E9E9E9
| 141356 ||  || — || January 8, 2002 || Socorro || LINEAR || GEF || align=right | 2.2 km || 
|-id=357 bgcolor=#d6d6d6
| 141357 ||  || — || January 8, 2002 || Socorro || LINEAR || — || align=right | 5.1 km || 
|-id=358 bgcolor=#d6d6d6
| 141358 ||  || — || January 12, 2002 || Oaxaca || J. M. Roe || — || align=right | 6.2 km || 
|-id=359 bgcolor=#fefefe
| 141359 ||  || — || January 9, 2002 || Socorro || LINEAR || H || align=right data-sort-value="0.96" | 960 m || 
|-id=360 bgcolor=#E9E9E9
| 141360 ||  || — || January 9, 2002 || Socorro || LINEAR || — || align=right | 4.2 km || 
|-id=361 bgcolor=#d6d6d6
| 141361 ||  || — || January 9, 2002 || Socorro || LINEAR || — || align=right | 5.1 km || 
|-id=362 bgcolor=#d6d6d6
| 141362 ||  || — || January 9, 2002 || Socorro || LINEAR || — || align=right | 4.2 km || 
|-id=363 bgcolor=#fefefe
| 141363 ||  || — || January 9, 2002 || Socorro || LINEAR || — || align=right | 1.4 km || 
|-id=364 bgcolor=#E9E9E9
| 141364 ||  || — || January 9, 2002 || Socorro || LINEAR || AGN || align=right | 2.6 km || 
|-id=365 bgcolor=#d6d6d6
| 141365 ||  || — || January 9, 2002 || Socorro || LINEAR || HYG || align=right | 5.6 km || 
|-id=366 bgcolor=#d6d6d6
| 141366 ||  || — || January 9, 2002 || Socorro || LINEAR || KOR || align=right | 1.9 km || 
|-id=367 bgcolor=#fefefe
| 141367 ||  || — || January 9, 2002 || Socorro || LINEAR || FLO || align=right data-sort-value="0.80" | 800 m || 
|-id=368 bgcolor=#d6d6d6
| 141368 ||  || — || January 9, 2002 || Socorro || LINEAR || HYG || align=right | 6.5 km || 
|-id=369 bgcolor=#d6d6d6
| 141369 ||  || — || January 9, 2002 || Socorro || LINEAR || THM || align=right | 3.6 km || 
|-id=370 bgcolor=#d6d6d6
| 141370 ||  || — || January 9, 2002 || Socorro || LINEAR || — || align=right | 5.1 km || 
|-id=371 bgcolor=#d6d6d6
| 141371 ||  || — || January 9, 2002 || Socorro || LINEAR || — || align=right | 4.0 km || 
|-id=372 bgcolor=#E9E9E9
| 141372 ||  || — || January 9, 2002 || Socorro || LINEAR || MIT || align=right | 3.9 km || 
|-id=373 bgcolor=#d6d6d6
| 141373 ||  || — || January 9, 2002 || Socorro || LINEAR || — || align=right | 7.1 km || 
|-id=374 bgcolor=#d6d6d6
| 141374 ||  || — || January 9, 2002 || Socorro || LINEAR || HYG || align=right | 4.9 km || 
|-id=375 bgcolor=#E9E9E9
| 141375 ||  || — || January 9, 2002 || Socorro || LINEAR || — || align=right | 2.4 km || 
|-id=376 bgcolor=#fefefe
| 141376 ||  || — || January 11, 2002 || Socorro || LINEAR || H || align=right data-sort-value="0.93" | 930 m || 
|-id=377 bgcolor=#d6d6d6
| 141377 ||  || — || January 11, 2002 || Socorro || LINEAR || 7:4 || align=right | 8.3 km || 
|-id=378 bgcolor=#d6d6d6
| 141378 ||  || — || January 12, 2002 || Socorro || LINEAR || — || align=right | 4.8 km || 
|-id=379 bgcolor=#d6d6d6
| 141379 ||  || — || January 12, 2002 || Socorro || LINEAR || — || align=right | 5.7 km || 
|-id=380 bgcolor=#d6d6d6
| 141380 ||  || — || January 11, 2002 || Kitt Peak || Spacewatch || — || align=right | 6.6 km || 
|-id=381 bgcolor=#d6d6d6
| 141381 ||  || — || January 8, 2002 || Socorro || LINEAR || — || align=right | 5.9 km || 
|-id=382 bgcolor=#d6d6d6
| 141382 ||  || — || January 8, 2002 || Socorro || LINEAR || EOS || align=right | 3.3 km || 
|-id=383 bgcolor=#d6d6d6
| 141383 ||  || — || January 8, 2002 || Socorro || LINEAR || KOR || align=right | 2.6 km || 
|-id=384 bgcolor=#d6d6d6
| 141384 ||  || — || January 8, 2002 || Socorro || LINEAR || — || align=right | 3.6 km || 
|-id=385 bgcolor=#d6d6d6
| 141385 ||  || — || January 8, 2002 || Socorro || LINEAR || THM || align=right | 3.2 km || 
|-id=386 bgcolor=#fefefe
| 141386 ||  || — || January 8, 2002 || Socorro || LINEAR || — || align=right | 4.1 km || 
|-id=387 bgcolor=#d6d6d6
| 141387 ||  || — || January 9, 2002 || Socorro || LINEAR || — || align=right | 5.3 km || 
|-id=388 bgcolor=#d6d6d6
| 141388 ||  || — || January 9, 2002 || Socorro || LINEAR || — || align=right | 6.8 km || 
|-id=389 bgcolor=#E9E9E9
| 141389 ||  || — || January 9, 2002 || Socorro || LINEAR || — || align=right | 3.7 km || 
|-id=390 bgcolor=#d6d6d6
| 141390 ||  || — || January 9, 2002 || Socorro || LINEAR || EUP || align=right | 6.4 km || 
|-id=391 bgcolor=#d6d6d6
| 141391 ||  || — || January 9, 2002 || Socorro || LINEAR || — || align=right | 4.1 km || 
|-id=392 bgcolor=#d6d6d6
| 141392 ||  || — || January 9, 2002 || Socorro || LINEAR || — || align=right | 5.0 km || 
|-id=393 bgcolor=#d6d6d6
| 141393 ||  || — || January 9, 2002 || Socorro || LINEAR || KOR || align=right | 2.5 km || 
|-id=394 bgcolor=#d6d6d6
| 141394 ||  || — || January 9, 2002 || Socorro || LINEAR || 7:4 || align=right | 4.3 km || 
|-id=395 bgcolor=#d6d6d6
| 141395 ||  || — || January 14, 2002 || Desert Eagle || W. K. Y. Yeung || — || align=right | 6.6 km || 
|-id=396 bgcolor=#fefefe
| 141396 ||  || — || January 13, 2002 || Socorro || LINEAR || — || align=right | 2.7 km || 
|-id=397 bgcolor=#d6d6d6
| 141397 ||  || — || January 15, 2002 || Kingsnake || J. V. McClusky || — || align=right | 6.2 km || 
|-id=398 bgcolor=#fefefe
| 141398 ||  || — || January 15, 2002 || Kingsnake || J. V. McClusky || H || align=right data-sort-value="0.84" | 840 m || 
|-id=399 bgcolor=#fefefe
| 141399 ||  || — || January 8, 2002 || Socorro || LINEAR || H || align=right | 1.1 km || 
|-id=400 bgcolor=#d6d6d6
| 141400 ||  || — || January 8, 2002 || Socorro || LINEAR || — || align=right | 6.0 km || 
|}

141401–141500 

|-bgcolor=#d6d6d6
| 141401 ||  || — || January 9, 2002 || Socorro || LINEAR || — || align=right | 3.9 km || 
|-id=402 bgcolor=#d6d6d6
| 141402 ||  || — || January 13, 2002 || Socorro || LINEAR || THM || align=right | 3.2 km || 
|-id=403 bgcolor=#d6d6d6
| 141403 ||  || — || January 14, 2002 || Socorro || LINEAR || THM || align=right | 2.9 km || 
|-id=404 bgcolor=#d6d6d6
| 141404 ||  || — || January 14, 2002 || Socorro || LINEAR || HYG || align=right | 6.8 km || 
|-id=405 bgcolor=#d6d6d6
| 141405 ||  || — || January 14, 2002 || Socorro || LINEAR || THM || align=right | 4.1 km || 
|-id=406 bgcolor=#fefefe
| 141406 ||  || — || January 13, 2002 || Socorro || LINEAR || NYS || align=right | 1.2 km || 
|-id=407 bgcolor=#d6d6d6
| 141407 ||  || — || January 13, 2002 || Socorro || LINEAR || HYG || align=right | 4.1 km || 
|-id=408 bgcolor=#d6d6d6
| 141408 ||  || — || January 14, 2002 || Socorro || LINEAR || HYG || align=right | 3.4 km || 
|-id=409 bgcolor=#fefefe
| 141409 ||  || — || January 14, 2002 || Socorro || LINEAR || MAS || align=right | 1.1 km || 
|-id=410 bgcolor=#d6d6d6
| 141410 ||  || — || January 6, 2002 || Socorro || LINEAR || — || align=right | 9.5 km || 
|-id=411 bgcolor=#d6d6d6
| 141411 ||  || — || January 5, 2002 || Palomar || NEAT || — || align=right | 5.2 km || 
|-id=412 bgcolor=#d6d6d6
| 141412 ||  || — || January 8, 2002 || Palomar || NEAT || — || align=right | 5.5 km || 
|-id=413 bgcolor=#d6d6d6
| 141413 ||  || — || January 8, 2002 || Socorro || LINEAR || — || align=right | 3.5 km || 
|-id=414 bgcolor=#d6d6d6
| 141414 Bochanski ||  ||  || January 8, 2002 || Apache Point || SDSS || — || align=right | 5.3 km || 
|-id=415 bgcolor=#d6d6d6
| 141415 ||  || — || January 19, 2002 || Anderson Mesa || LONEOS || Tj (2.98) || align=right | 6.3 km || 
|-id=416 bgcolor=#d6d6d6
| 141416 ||  || — || January 21, 2002 || Palomar || NEAT || — || align=right | 6.5 km || 
|-id=417 bgcolor=#fefefe
| 141417 ||  || — || January 22, 2002 || Socorro || LINEAR || H || align=right | 1.2 km || 
|-id=418 bgcolor=#fefefe
| 141418 ||  || — || January 25, 2002 || Socorro || LINEAR || H || align=right data-sort-value="0.92" | 920 m || 
|-id=419 bgcolor=#d6d6d6
| 141419 ||  || — || January 25, 2002 || Socorro || LINEAR || EUP || align=right | 7.8 km || 
|-id=420 bgcolor=#d6d6d6
| 141420 ||  || — || January 23, 2002 || Socorro || LINEAR || SYL7:4 || align=right | 6.8 km || 
|-id=421 bgcolor=#d6d6d6
| 141421 ||  || — || January 20, 2002 || Anderson Mesa || LONEOS || — || align=right | 8.0 km || 
|-id=422 bgcolor=#d6d6d6
| 141422 ||  || — || January 21, 2002 || Anderson Mesa || LONEOS || — || align=right | 7.6 km || 
|-id=423 bgcolor=#d6d6d6
| 141423 ||  || — || January 21, 2002 || Anderson Mesa || LONEOS || — || align=right | 6.9 km || 
|-id=424 bgcolor=#FFC2E0
| 141424 || 2002 CD || — || February 1, 2002 || Socorro || LINEAR || ATEcritical || align=right data-sort-value="0.28" | 280 m || 
|-id=425 bgcolor=#fefefe
| 141425 ||  || — || February 3, 2002 || Palomar || NEAT || — || align=right | 1.4 km || 
|-id=426 bgcolor=#fefefe
| 141426 ||  || — || February 1, 2002 || Socorro || LINEAR || H || align=right | 1.3 km || 
|-id=427 bgcolor=#FA8072
| 141427 ||  || — || February 1, 2002 || Socorro || LINEAR || H || align=right data-sort-value="0.93" | 930 m || 
|-id=428 bgcolor=#fefefe
| 141428 ||  || — || February 6, 2002 || Desert Eagle || W. K. Y. Yeung || NYS || align=right | 1.3 km || 
|-id=429 bgcolor=#E9E9E9
| 141429 ||  || — || February 6, 2002 || Kitt Peak || Spacewatch || AGN || align=right | 2.2 km || 
|-id=430 bgcolor=#fefefe
| 141430 ||  || — || February 6, 2002 || Socorro || LINEAR || H || align=right | 1.3 km || 
|-id=431 bgcolor=#fefefe
| 141431 ||  || — || February 6, 2002 || Socorro || LINEAR || H || align=right | 1.3 km || 
|-id=432 bgcolor=#FFC2E0
| 141432 ||  || — || February 6, 2002 || Socorro || LINEAR || ATEPHAcritical || align=right data-sort-value="0.24" | 240 m || 
|-id=433 bgcolor=#d6d6d6
| 141433 ||  || — || February 8, 2002 || Fountain Hills || C. W. Juels, P. R. Holvorcem || — || align=right | 3.8 km || 
|-id=434 bgcolor=#d6d6d6
| 141434 ||  || — || February 9, 2002 || Pla D'Arguines || R. Ferrando || — || align=right | 4.7 km || 
|-id=435 bgcolor=#d6d6d6
| 141435 ||  || — || February 4, 2002 || Palomar || NEAT || EOS || align=right | 3.3 km || 
|-id=436 bgcolor=#fefefe
| 141436 ||  || — || February 4, 2002 || Palomar || NEAT || — || align=right | 1.3 km || 
|-id=437 bgcolor=#d6d6d6
| 141437 ||  || — || February 6, 2002 || Socorro || LINEAR || — || align=right | 8.5 km || 
|-id=438 bgcolor=#d6d6d6
| 141438 ||  || — || February 6, 2002 || Socorro || LINEAR || EOS || align=right | 3.9 km || 
|-id=439 bgcolor=#d6d6d6
| 141439 ||  || — || February 6, 2002 || Socorro || LINEAR || HYG || align=right | 5.8 km || 
|-id=440 bgcolor=#d6d6d6
| 141440 ||  || — || February 6, 2002 || Socorro || LINEAR || HYG || align=right | 4.6 km || 
|-id=441 bgcolor=#fefefe
| 141441 ||  || — || February 6, 2002 || Socorro || LINEAR || — || align=right | 1.5 km || 
|-id=442 bgcolor=#d6d6d6
| 141442 ||  || — || February 6, 2002 || Socorro || LINEAR || — || align=right | 3.7 km || 
|-id=443 bgcolor=#d6d6d6
| 141443 ||  || — || February 12, 2002 || Fountain Hills || C. W. Juels, P. R. Holvorcem || — || align=right | 6.2 km || 
|-id=444 bgcolor=#fefefe
| 141444 ||  || — || February 8, 2002 || Palomar || NEAT || H || align=right | 1.1 km || 
|-id=445 bgcolor=#d6d6d6
| 141445 ||  || — || February 7, 2002 || Socorro || LINEAR || — || align=right | 4.6 km || 
|-id=446 bgcolor=#d6d6d6
| 141446 ||  || — || February 7, 2002 || Kitt Peak || Spacewatch || — || align=right | 4.5 km || 
|-id=447 bgcolor=#FFC2E0
| 141447 ||  || — || February 13, 2002 || Socorro || LINEAR || AMO +1km || align=right | 1.4 km || 
|-id=448 bgcolor=#d6d6d6
| 141448 ||  || — || February 6, 2002 || Socorro || LINEAR || — || align=right | 5.7 km || 
|-id=449 bgcolor=#d6d6d6
| 141449 ||  || — || February 6, 2002 || Socorro || LINEAR || — || align=right | 5.0 km || 
|-id=450 bgcolor=#d6d6d6
| 141450 ||  || — || February 7, 2002 || Socorro || LINEAR || — || align=right | 3.7 km || 
|-id=451 bgcolor=#d6d6d6
| 141451 ||  || — || February 7, 2002 || Socorro || LINEAR || — || align=right | 5.0 km || 
|-id=452 bgcolor=#d6d6d6
| 141452 ||  || — || February 7, 2002 || Socorro || LINEAR || THM || align=right | 3.4 km || 
|-id=453 bgcolor=#fefefe
| 141453 ||  || — || February 7, 2002 || Socorro || LINEAR || — || align=right | 1.1 km || 
|-id=454 bgcolor=#d6d6d6
| 141454 ||  || — || February 7, 2002 || Socorro || LINEAR || — || align=right | 4.5 km || 
|-id=455 bgcolor=#fefefe
| 141455 ||  || — || February 7, 2002 || Socorro || LINEAR || NYS || align=right | 1.2 km || 
|-id=456 bgcolor=#fefefe
| 141456 ||  || — || February 7, 2002 || Socorro || LINEAR || V || align=right data-sort-value="0.99" | 990 m || 
|-id=457 bgcolor=#fefefe
| 141457 ||  || — || February 7, 2002 || Socorro || LINEAR || — || align=right data-sort-value="0.94" | 940 m || 
|-id=458 bgcolor=#d6d6d6
| 141458 ||  || — || February 7, 2002 || Socorro || LINEAR || — || align=right | 5.4 km || 
|-id=459 bgcolor=#d6d6d6
| 141459 ||  || — || February 7, 2002 || Socorro || LINEAR || KOR || align=right | 3.1 km || 
|-id=460 bgcolor=#d6d6d6
| 141460 ||  || — || February 7, 2002 || Socorro || LINEAR || THM || align=right | 5.0 km || 
|-id=461 bgcolor=#d6d6d6
| 141461 ||  || — || February 7, 2002 || Socorro || LINEAR || — || align=right | 4.8 km || 
|-id=462 bgcolor=#d6d6d6
| 141462 ||  || — || February 7, 2002 || Socorro || LINEAR || KOR || align=right | 2.2 km || 
|-id=463 bgcolor=#d6d6d6
| 141463 ||  || — || February 7, 2002 || Socorro || LINEAR || THB || align=right | 5.5 km || 
|-id=464 bgcolor=#d6d6d6
| 141464 ||  || — || February 8, 2002 || Socorro || LINEAR || EOS || align=right | 3.7 km || 
|-id=465 bgcolor=#d6d6d6
| 141465 ||  || — || February 8, 2002 || Socorro || LINEAR || HYG || align=right | 5.8 km || 
|-id=466 bgcolor=#fefefe
| 141466 ||  || — || February 9, 2002 || Socorro || LINEAR || H || align=right data-sort-value="0.95" | 950 m || 
|-id=467 bgcolor=#d6d6d6
| 141467 ||  || — || February 7, 2002 || Haleakala || NEAT || MEL || align=right | 8.0 km || 
|-id=468 bgcolor=#fefefe
| 141468 ||  || — || February 8, 2002 || Socorro || LINEAR || NYS || align=right | 1.0 km || 
|-id=469 bgcolor=#fefefe
| 141469 ||  || — || February 8, 2002 || Socorro || LINEAR || NYS || align=right data-sort-value="0.88" | 880 m || 
|-id=470 bgcolor=#d6d6d6
| 141470 ||  || — || February 10, 2002 || Socorro || LINEAR || — || align=right | 3.9 km || 
|-id=471 bgcolor=#fefefe
| 141471 ||  || — || February 10, 2002 || Socorro || LINEAR || — || align=right | 1.2 km || 
|-id=472 bgcolor=#d6d6d6
| 141472 ||  || — || February 10, 2002 || Socorro || LINEAR || — || align=right | 3.2 km || 
|-id=473 bgcolor=#d6d6d6
| 141473 ||  || — || February 10, 2002 || Socorro || LINEAR || — || align=right | 4.0 km || 
|-id=474 bgcolor=#d6d6d6
| 141474 ||  || — || February 10, 2002 || Socorro || LINEAR || — || align=right | 3.5 km || 
|-id=475 bgcolor=#d6d6d6
| 141475 ||  || — || February 13, 2002 || Kitt Peak || Spacewatch || EOS || align=right | 3.7 km || 
|-id=476 bgcolor=#E9E9E9
| 141476 ||  || — || February 11, 2002 || Socorro || LINEAR || — || align=right | 4.4 km || 
|-id=477 bgcolor=#fefefe
| 141477 ||  || — || February 13, 2002 || Kitt Peak || Spacewatch || — || align=right | 1.0 km || 
|-id=478 bgcolor=#d6d6d6
| 141478 ||  || — || February 4, 2002 || Anderson Mesa || LONEOS || — || align=right | 6.0 km || 
|-id=479 bgcolor=#fefefe
| 141479 ||  || — || February 8, 2002 || Kitt Peak || Spacewatch || ERI || align=right | 3.2 km || 
|-id=480 bgcolor=#fefefe
| 141480 ||  || — || February 8, 2002 || Anderson Mesa || LONEOS || ERI || align=right | 2.9 km || 
|-id=481 bgcolor=#d6d6d6
| 141481 ||  || — || February 10, 2002 || Socorro || LINEAR || 7:4 || align=right | 4.4 km || 
|-id=482 bgcolor=#fefefe
| 141482 ||  || — || February 19, 2002 || Socorro || LINEAR || H || align=right data-sort-value="0.93" | 930 m || 
|-id=483 bgcolor=#fefefe
| 141483 ||  || — || February 19, 2002 || Socorro || LINEAR || H || align=right | 1.2 km || 
|-id=484 bgcolor=#FFC2E0
| 141484 ||  || — || February 26, 2002 || Anderson Mesa || LONEOS || ATE +1km || align=right | 1.0 km || 
|-id=485 bgcolor=#d6d6d6
| 141485 ||  || — || February 19, 2002 || Socorro || LINEAR || — || align=right | 6.5 km || 
|-id=486 bgcolor=#d6d6d6
| 141486 ||  || — || February 19, 2002 || Socorro || LINEAR || EUP || align=right | 10 km || 
|-id=487 bgcolor=#fefefe
| 141487 ||  || — || February 20, 2002 || Kitt Peak || Spacewatch || — || align=right data-sort-value="0.94" | 940 m || 
|-id=488 bgcolor=#fefefe
| 141488 ||  || — || February 21, 2002 || Socorro || LINEAR || H || align=right | 1.2 km || 
|-id=489 bgcolor=#fefefe
| 141489 ||  || — || February 22, 2002 || Palomar || NEAT || — || align=right data-sort-value="0.68" | 680 m || 
|-id=490 bgcolor=#fefefe
| 141490 || 2002 EH || — || March 3, 2002 || Socorro || LINEAR || H || align=right | 1.0 km || 
|-id=491 bgcolor=#fefefe
| 141491 || 2002 EL || — || March 4, 2002 || Socorro || LINEAR || H || align=right | 1.5 km || 
|-id=492 bgcolor=#fefefe
| 141492 ||  || — || March 6, 2002 || Siding Spring || R. H. McNaught || — || align=right data-sort-value="0.88" | 880 m || 
|-id=493 bgcolor=#fefefe
| 141493 ||  || — || March 12, 2002 || Socorro || LINEAR || — || align=right | 1.3 km || 
|-id=494 bgcolor=#fefefe
| 141494 ||  || — || March 13, 2002 || Socorro || LINEAR || H || align=right | 1.3 km || 
|-id=495 bgcolor=#FFC2E0
| 141495 ||  || — || March 15, 2002 || Palomar || NEAT || APOPHA || align=right data-sort-value="0.78" | 780 m || 
|-id=496 bgcolor=#fefefe
| 141496 Bartkevicius ||  ||  || March 15, 2002 || Moletai || K. Černis, J. Zdanavičius || MAS || align=right | 1.3 km || 
|-id=497 bgcolor=#d6d6d6
| 141497 ||  || — || March 3, 2002 || Haleakala || NEAT || THM || align=right | 5.8 km || 
|-id=498 bgcolor=#FFC2E0
| 141498 ||  || — || March 8, 2002 || Mauna Kea || D. J. Tholen || ATE || align=right data-sort-value="0.74" | 740 m || 
|-id=499 bgcolor=#fefefe
| 141499 ||  || — || March 9, 2002 || Socorro || LINEAR || — || align=right | 1.3 km || 
|-id=500 bgcolor=#fefefe
| 141500 ||  || — || March 9, 2002 || Kitt Peak || Spacewatch || — || align=right | 1.0 km || 
|}

141501–141600 

|-bgcolor=#fefefe
| 141501 ||  || — || March 12, 2002 || Socorro || LINEAR || NYS || align=right | 1.0 km || 
|-id=502 bgcolor=#fefefe
| 141502 ||  || — || March 11, 2002 || Haleakala || NEAT || NYS || align=right | 1.0 km || 
|-id=503 bgcolor=#d6d6d6
| 141503 ||  || — || March 13, 2002 || Socorro || LINEAR || 3:2 || align=right | 11 km || 
|-id=504 bgcolor=#d6d6d6
| 141504 ||  || — || March 13, 2002 || Socorro || LINEAR || HYG || align=right | 6.6 km || 
|-id=505 bgcolor=#fefefe
| 141505 ||  || — || March 13, 2002 || Socorro || LINEAR || — || align=right | 1.1 km || 
|-id=506 bgcolor=#fefefe
| 141506 ||  || — || March 13, 2002 || Socorro || LINEAR || — || align=right | 1.1 km || 
|-id=507 bgcolor=#fefefe
| 141507 ||  || — || March 10, 2002 || Haleakala || NEAT || — || align=right | 1.4 km || 
|-id=508 bgcolor=#d6d6d6
| 141508 ||  || — || March 12, 2002 || Palomar || NEAT || — || align=right | 5.0 km || 
|-id=509 bgcolor=#fefefe
| 141509 ||  || — || March 9, 2002 || Socorro || LINEAR || — || align=right | 1.3 km || 
|-id=510 bgcolor=#E9E9E9
| 141510 ||  || — || March 9, 2002 || Socorro || LINEAR || — || align=right | 4.1 km || 
|-id=511 bgcolor=#d6d6d6
| 141511 ||  || — || March 12, 2002 || Socorro || LINEAR || THM || align=right | 3.8 km || 
|-id=512 bgcolor=#fefefe
| 141512 ||  || — || March 12, 2002 || Socorro || LINEAR || FLO || align=right data-sort-value="0.89" | 890 m || 
|-id=513 bgcolor=#d6d6d6
| 141513 ||  || — || March 14, 2002 || Socorro || LINEAR || SYL7:4 || align=right | 7.0 km || 
|-id=514 bgcolor=#d6d6d6
| 141514 ||  || — || March 14, 2002 || Socorro || LINEAR || THM || align=right | 4.8 km || 
|-id=515 bgcolor=#d6d6d6
| 141515 ||  || — || March 12, 2002 || Socorro || LINEAR || — || align=right | 5.5 km || 
|-id=516 bgcolor=#fefefe
| 141516 ||  || — || March 13, 2002 || Socorro || LINEAR || — || align=right | 1.3 km || 
|-id=517 bgcolor=#fefefe
| 141517 ||  || — || March 6, 2002 || Palomar || NEAT || — || align=right | 1.3 km || 
|-id=518 bgcolor=#d6d6d6
| 141518 ||  || — || March 12, 2002 || Kitt Peak || Spacewatch || HIL3:2 || align=right | 9.2 km || 
|-id=519 bgcolor=#d6d6d6
| 141519 ||  || — || March 12, 2002 || Palomar || NEAT || — || align=right | 4.1 km || 
|-id=520 bgcolor=#E9E9E9
| 141520 ||  || — || March 13, 2002 || Kitt Peak || Spacewatch || — || align=right | 1.9 km || 
|-id=521 bgcolor=#fefefe
| 141521 ||  || — || March 13, 2002 || Kitt Peak || Spacewatch || NYS || align=right | 1.2 km || 
|-id=522 bgcolor=#d6d6d6
| 141522 ||  || — || March 14, 2002 || Palomar || NEAT || — || align=right | 6.7 km || 
|-id=523 bgcolor=#C2FFFF
| 141523 ||  || — || March 15, 2002 || Palomar || NEAT || L4 || align=right | 14 km || 
|-id=524 bgcolor=#fefefe
| 141524 ||  || — || March 20, 2002 || Socorro || LINEAR || H || align=right | 1.2 km || 
|-id=525 bgcolor=#FFC2E0
| 141525 ||  || — || March 21, 2002 || Socorro || LINEAR || APO +1kmPHA || align=right data-sort-value="0.86" | 860 m || 
|-id=526 bgcolor=#FFC2E0
| 141526 ||  || — || March 21, 2002 || Anderson Mesa || LONEOS || APOcritical || align=right data-sort-value="0.37" | 370 m || 
|-id=527 bgcolor=#FFC2E0
| 141527 ||  || — || March 28, 2002 || Haleakala || NEAT || APOPHA || align=right data-sort-value="0.60" | 600 m || 
|-id=528 bgcolor=#d6d6d6
| 141528 ||  || — || March 19, 2002 || Socorro || LINEAR || — || align=right | 5.0 km || 
|-id=529 bgcolor=#d6d6d6
| 141529 ||  || — || March 19, 2002 || Palomar || NEAT || TIR || align=right | 5.7 km || 
|-id=530 bgcolor=#fefefe
| 141530 ||  || — || March 30, 2002 || Palomar || NEAT || H || align=right | 1.1 km || 
|-id=531 bgcolor=#FFC2E0
| 141531 || 2002 GB || — || April 1, 2002 || Socorro || LINEAR || ATE || align=right data-sort-value="0.3" | 300 m || 
|-id=532 bgcolor=#fefefe
| 141532 ||  || — || April 6, 2002 || Socorro || LINEAR || — || align=right | 1.4 km || 
|-id=533 bgcolor=#fefefe
| 141533 ||  || — || April 6, 2002 || Socorro || LINEAR || H || align=right | 1.3 km || 
|-id=534 bgcolor=#fefefe
| 141534 ||  || — || April 8, 2002 || Socorro || LINEAR || H || align=right | 1.3 km || 
|-id=535 bgcolor=#FA8072
| 141535 ||  || — || April 10, 2002 || Socorro || LINEAR || — || align=right | 1.5 km || 
|-id=536 bgcolor=#fefefe
| 141536 ||  || — || April 14, 2002 || Desert Eagle || W. K. Y. Yeung || — || align=right | 1.3 km || 
|-id=537 bgcolor=#fefefe
| 141537 ||  || — || April 10, 2002 || Socorro || LINEAR || FLO || align=right | 1.0 km || 
|-id=538 bgcolor=#fefefe
| 141538 ||  || — || April 10, 2002 || Socorro || LINEAR || — || align=right | 1.5 km || 
|-id=539 bgcolor=#fefefe
| 141539 ||  || — || April 14, 2002 || Socorro || LINEAR || — || align=right data-sort-value="0.92" | 920 m || 
|-id=540 bgcolor=#fefefe
| 141540 ||  || — || April 14, 2002 || Socorro || LINEAR || V || align=right | 1.1 km || 
|-id=541 bgcolor=#fefefe
| 141541 ||  || — || April 14, 2002 || Socorro || LINEAR || — || align=right | 1.4 km || 
|-id=542 bgcolor=#fefefe
| 141542 ||  || — || April 12, 2002 || Haleakala || NEAT || — || align=right | 1.3 km || 
|-id=543 bgcolor=#fefefe
| 141543 ||  || — || April 14, 2002 || Haleakala || NEAT || FLO || align=right data-sort-value="0.96" | 960 m || 
|-id=544 bgcolor=#d6d6d6
| 141544 ||  || — || April 15, 2002 || Palomar || NEAT || HYG || align=right | 6.1 km || 
|-id=545 bgcolor=#fefefe
| 141545 ||  || — || April 14, 2002 || Socorro || LINEAR || — || align=right | 1.6 km || 
|-id=546 bgcolor=#E9E9E9
| 141546 ||  || — || April 4, 2002 || Palomar || NEAT || PAD || align=right | 4.8 km || 
|-id=547 bgcolor=#fefefe
| 141547 ||  || — || April 5, 2002 || Anderson Mesa || LONEOS || — || align=right | 1.0 km || 
|-id=548 bgcolor=#E9E9E9
| 141548 ||  || — || April 5, 2002 || Palomar || NEAT || — || align=right | 1.7 km || 
|-id=549 bgcolor=#fefefe
| 141549 ||  || — || April 5, 2002 || Anderson Mesa || LONEOS || FLO || align=right data-sort-value="0.98" | 980 m || 
|-id=550 bgcolor=#fefefe
| 141550 ||  || — || April 5, 2002 || Anderson Mesa || LONEOS || — || align=right | 1.0 km || 
|-id=551 bgcolor=#fefefe
| 141551 ||  || — || April 5, 2002 || Anderson Mesa || LONEOS || — || align=right | 1.0 km || 
|-id=552 bgcolor=#fefefe
| 141552 ||  || — || April 5, 2002 || Anderson Mesa || LONEOS || — || align=right | 1.0 km || 
|-id=553 bgcolor=#fefefe
| 141553 ||  || — || April 8, 2002 || Palomar || NEAT || — || align=right | 1.4 km || 
|-id=554 bgcolor=#fefefe
| 141554 ||  || — || April 8, 2002 || Palomar || NEAT || — || align=right | 1.2 km || 
|-id=555 bgcolor=#fefefe
| 141555 ||  || — || April 8, 2002 || Palomar || NEAT || — || align=right | 1.1 km || 
|-id=556 bgcolor=#fefefe
| 141556 ||  || — || April 8, 2002 || Palomar || NEAT || — || align=right | 1.3 km || 
|-id=557 bgcolor=#d6d6d6
| 141557 ||  || — || April 8, 2002 || Palomar || NEAT || SHU3:2 || align=right | 11 km || 
|-id=558 bgcolor=#fefefe
| 141558 ||  || — || April 9, 2002 || Anderson Mesa || LONEOS || — || align=right | 1.2 km || 
|-id=559 bgcolor=#fefefe
| 141559 ||  || — || April 7, 2002 || Bergisch Gladbach || W. Bickel || — || align=right | 1.5 km || 
|-id=560 bgcolor=#fefefe
| 141560 ||  || — || April 9, 2002 || Socorro || LINEAR || NYS || align=right data-sort-value="0.99" | 990 m || 
|-id=561 bgcolor=#fefefe
| 141561 ||  || — || April 10, 2002 || Socorro || LINEAR || — || align=right | 1.3 km || 
|-id=562 bgcolor=#d6d6d6
| 141562 ||  || — || April 10, 2002 || Palomar || NEAT || — || align=right | 4.8 km || 
|-id=563 bgcolor=#fefefe
| 141563 ||  || — || April 9, 2002 || Socorro || LINEAR || — || align=right | 1.5 km || 
|-id=564 bgcolor=#fefefe
| 141564 ||  || — || April 10, 2002 || Socorro || LINEAR || — || align=right | 2.6 km || 
|-id=565 bgcolor=#fefefe
| 141565 ||  || — || April 10, 2002 || Socorro || LINEAR || — || align=right | 1.2 km || 
|-id=566 bgcolor=#fefefe
| 141566 ||  || — || April 11, 2002 || Socorro || LINEAR || — || align=right | 1.3 km || 
|-id=567 bgcolor=#fefefe
| 141567 ||  || — || April 11, 2002 || Socorro || LINEAR || — || align=right | 1.3 km || 
|-id=568 bgcolor=#fefefe
| 141568 ||  || — || April 10, 2002 || Socorro || LINEAR || — || align=right | 1.2 km || 
|-id=569 bgcolor=#fefefe
| 141569 ||  || — || April 10, 2002 || Socorro || LINEAR || V || align=right data-sort-value="0.83" | 830 m || 
|-id=570 bgcolor=#fefefe
| 141570 ||  || — || April 12, 2002 || Socorro || LINEAR || NYS || align=right data-sort-value="0.76" | 760 m || 
|-id=571 bgcolor=#E9E9E9
| 141571 ||  || — || April 12, 2002 || Palomar || NEAT || — || align=right | 1.8 km || 
|-id=572 bgcolor=#fefefe
| 141572 ||  || — || April 12, 2002 || Socorro || LINEAR || KLI || align=right | 5.0 km || 
|-id=573 bgcolor=#E9E9E9
| 141573 ||  || — || April 12, 2002 || Socorro || LINEAR || NEM || align=right | 3.2 km || 
|-id=574 bgcolor=#d6d6d6
| 141574 ||  || — || April 12, 2002 || Palomar || NEAT || — || align=right | 5.7 km || 
|-id=575 bgcolor=#E9E9E9
| 141575 ||  || — || April 13, 2002 || Palomar || NEAT || — || align=right | 1.9 km || 
|-id=576 bgcolor=#fefefe
| 141576 ||  || — || April 13, 2002 || Palomar || NEAT || V || align=right | 1.3 km || 
|-id=577 bgcolor=#C2FFFF
| 141577 ||  || — || April 14, 2002 || Socorro || LINEAR || L4 || align=right | 15 km || 
|-id=578 bgcolor=#fefefe
| 141578 ||  || — || April 14, 2002 || Socorro || LINEAR || — || align=right data-sort-value="0.98" | 980 m || 
|-id=579 bgcolor=#fefefe
| 141579 ||  || — || April 15, 2002 || Anderson Mesa || LONEOS || — || align=right | 1.4 km || 
|-id=580 bgcolor=#E9E9E9
| 141580 ||  || — || April 14, 2002 || Palomar || NEAT || — || align=right | 2.0 km || 
|-id=581 bgcolor=#fefefe
| 141581 ||  || — || April 9, 2002 || Socorro || LINEAR || — || align=right | 1.4 km || 
|-id=582 bgcolor=#fefefe
| 141582 ||  || — || April 9, 2002 || Socorro || LINEAR || V || align=right | 1.0 km || 
|-id=583 bgcolor=#fefefe
| 141583 ||  || — || April 10, 2002 || Socorro || LINEAR || FLO || align=right | 3.6 km || 
|-id=584 bgcolor=#C2FFFF
| 141584 ||  || — || April 15, 2002 || Palomar || NEAT || L4 || align=right | 16 km || 
|-id=585 bgcolor=#fefefe
| 141585 || 2002 HE || — || April 16, 2002 || Socorro || LINEAR || H || align=right | 1.4 km || 
|-id=586 bgcolor=#fefefe
| 141586 || 2002 HQ || — || April 16, 2002 || Desert Eagle || W. K. Y. Yeung || FLO || align=right | 1.4 km || 
|-id=587 bgcolor=#fefefe
| 141587 ||  || — || April 16, 2002 || Socorro || LINEAR || FLO || align=right | 1.0 km || 
|-id=588 bgcolor=#fefefe
| 141588 ||  || — || April 16, 2002 || Socorro || LINEAR || — || align=right | 1.2 km || 
|-id=589 bgcolor=#fefefe
| 141589 ||  || — || April 16, 2002 || Socorro || LINEAR || — || align=right | 1.1 km || 
|-id=590 bgcolor=#fefefe
| 141590 ||  || — || April 18, 2002 || Palomar || NEAT || FLO || align=right | 1.0 km || 
|-id=591 bgcolor=#fefefe
| 141591 ||  || — || April 16, 2002 || Socorro || LINEAR || — || align=right | 1.1 km || 
|-id=592 bgcolor=#fefefe
| 141592 ||  || — || April 18, 2002 || Socorro || LINEAR || NYS || align=right | 2.1 km || 
|-id=593 bgcolor=#FFC2E0
| 141593 ||  || — || April 30, 2002 || Palomar || NEAT || APO +1kmPHA || align=right data-sort-value="0.81" | 810 m || 
|-id=594 bgcolor=#fefefe
| 141594 ||  || — || April 30, 2002 || Needville || Needville Obs. || — || align=right data-sort-value="0.90" | 900 m || 
|-id=595 bgcolor=#fefefe
| 141595 ||  || — || April 21, 2002 || Socorro || LINEAR || H || align=right | 1.4 km || 
|-id=596 bgcolor=#fefefe
| 141596 ||  || — || April 21, 2002 || Socorro || LINEAR || PHO || align=right | 2.2 km || 
|-id=597 bgcolor=#E9E9E9
| 141597 ||  || — || April 19, 2002 || Kitt Peak || Spacewatch || — || align=right | 2.8 km || 
|-id=598 bgcolor=#fefefe
| 141598 || 2002 JJ || — || May 3, 2002 || Desert Eagle || W. K. Y. Yeung || V || align=right | 1.2 km || 
|-id=599 bgcolor=#fefefe
| 141599 || 2002 JL || — || May 3, 2002 || Desert Eagle || W. K. Y. Yeung || — || align=right | 1.4 km || 
|-id=600 bgcolor=#fefefe
| 141600 ||  || — || May 4, 2002 || Desert Eagle || W. K. Y. Yeung || — || align=right | 1.8 km || 
|}

141601–141700 

|-bgcolor=#fefefe
| 141601 ||  || — || May 5, 2002 || Socorro || LINEAR || PHO || align=right | 2.0 km || 
|-id=602 bgcolor=#fefefe
| 141602 ||  || — || May 5, 2002 || Socorro || LINEAR || H || align=right | 1.2 km || 
|-id=603 bgcolor=#fefefe
| 141603 ||  || — || May 5, 2002 || Desert Eagle || W. K. Y. Yeung || — || align=right | 1.1 km || 
|-id=604 bgcolor=#fefefe
| 141604 ||  || — || May 5, 2002 || Desert Eagle || W. K. Y. Yeung || FLO || align=right | 1.4 km || 
|-id=605 bgcolor=#fefefe
| 141605 ||  || — || May 6, 2002 || Socorro || LINEAR || H || align=right | 1.3 km || 
|-id=606 bgcolor=#fefefe
| 141606 ||  || — || May 6, 2002 || Socorro || LINEAR || PHO || align=right | 1.6 km || 
|-id=607 bgcolor=#d6d6d6
| 141607 ||  || — || May 2, 2002 || Anderson Mesa || LONEOS || — || align=right | 6.6 km || 
|-id=608 bgcolor=#fefefe
| 141608 ||  || — || May 6, 2002 || Anderson Mesa || LONEOS || — || align=right | 1.5 km || 
|-id=609 bgcolor=#fefefe
| 141609 ||  || — || May 6, 2002 || Anderson Mesa || LONEOS || — || align=right | 1.5 km || 
|-id=610 bgcolor=#fefefe
| 141610 ||  || — || May 4, 2002 || Desert Eagle || W. K. Y. Yeung || FLO || align=right | 1.0 km || 
|-id=611 bgcolor=#fefefe
| 141611 ||  || — || May 6, 2002 || Desert Eagle || W. K. Y. Yeung || PHO || align=right | 2.0 km || 
|-id=612 bgcolor=#fefefe
| 141612 ||  || — || May 8, 2002 || Desert Eagle || W. K. Y. Yeung || — || align=right | 1.3 km || 
|-id=613 bgcolor=#fefefe
| 141613 ||  || — || May 8, 2002 || Socorro || LINEAR || FLO || align=right | 1.0 km || 
|-id=614 bgcolor=#FFC2E0
| 141614 ||  || — || May 8, 2002 || Socorro || LINEAR || APOPHAcritical || align=right data-sort-value="0.49" | 490 m || 
|-id=615 bgcolor=#E9E9E9
| 141615 ||  || — || May 7, 2002 || Palomar || NEAT || — || align=right | 2.1 km || 
|-id=616 bgcolor=#fefefe
| 141616 ||  || — || May 7, 2002 || Palomar || NEAT || — || align=right | 1.3 km || 
|-id=617 bgcolor=#fefefe
| 141617 ||  || — || May 8, 2002 || Socorro || LINEAR || — || align=right | 1.3 km || 
|-id=618 bgcolor=#fefefe
| 141618 ||  || — || May 8, 2002 || Socorro || LINEAR || — || align=right | 1.8 km || 
|-id=619 bgcolor=#fefefe
| 141619 ||  || — || May 8, 2002 || Socorro || LINEAR || — || align=right | 1.5 km || 
|-id=620 bgcolor=#fefefe
| 141620 ||  || — || May 9, 2002 || Socorro || LINEAR || — || align=right | 1.6 km || 
|-id=621 bgcolor=#fefefe
| 141621 ||  || — || May 9, 2002 || Socorro || LINEAR || — || align=right | 1.2 km || 
|-id=622 bgcolor=#fefefe
| 141622 ||  || — || May 9, 2002 || Socorro || LINEAR || — || align=right | 1.3 km || 
|-id=623 bgcolor=#fefefe
| 141623 ||  || — || May 9, 2002 || Socorro || LINEAR || — || align=right | 3.6 km || 
|-id=624 bgcolor=#fefefe
| 141624 ||  || — || May 9, 2002 || Socorro || LINEAR || — || align=right | 1.4 km || 
|-id=625 bgcolor=#fefefe
| 141625 ||  || — || May 9, 2002 || Socorro || LINEAR || — || align=right | 1.1 km || 
|-id=626 bgcolor=#fefefe
| 141626 ||  || — || May 9, 2002 || Anderson Mesa || LONEOS || — || align=right | 1.2 km || 
|-id=627 bgcolor=#fefefe
| 141627 ||  || — || May 8, 2002 || Haleakala || NEAT || — || align=right | 1.4 km || 
|-id=628 bgcolor=#fefefe
| 141628 ||  || — || May 9, 2002 || Palomar || NEAT || FLO || align=right | 1.1 km || 
|-id=629 bgcolor=#fefefe
| 141629 ||  || — || May 9, 2002 || Socorro || LINEAR || FLO || align=right | 1.1 km || 
|-id=630 bgcolor=#fefefe
| 141630 ||  || — || May 9, 2002 || Socorro || LINEAR || FLO || align=right | 1.3 km || 
|-id=631 bgcolor=#fefefe
| 141631 ||  || — || May 9, 2002 || Socorro || LINEAR || FLO || align=right | 1.3 km || 
|-id=632 bgcolor=#fefefe
| 141632 ||  || — || May 9, 2002 || Socorro || LINEAR || FLO || align=right | 1.1 km || 
|-id=633 bgcolor=#fefefe
| 141633 ||  || — || May 9, 2002 || Socorro || LINEAR || — || align=right | 1.2 km || 
|-id=634 bgcolor=#E9E9E9
| 141634 ||  || — || May 9, 2002 || Socorro || LINEAR || — || align=right | 1.7 km || 
|-id=635 bgcolor=#fefefe
| 141635 ||  || — || May 9, 2002 || Socorro || LINEAR || — || align=right | 1.2 km || 
|-id=636 bgcolor=#fefefe
| 141636 ||  || — || May 9, 2002 || Socorro || LINEAR || — || align=right | 1.5 km || 
|-id=637 bgcolor=#fefefe
| 141637 ||  || — || May 9, 2002 || Socorro || LINEAR || — || align=right | 1.1 km || 
|-id=638 bgcolor=#fefefe
| 141638 ||  || — || May 9, 2002 || Socorro || LINEAR || V || align=right | 1.2 km || 
|-id=639 bgcolor=#fefefe
| 141639 ||  || — || May 9, 2002 || Socorro || LINEAR || — || align=right | 1.2 km || 
|-id=640 bgcolor=#fefefe
| 141640 ||  || — || May 9, 2002 || Socorro || LINEAR || FLO || align=right | 1.2 km || 
|-id=641 bgcolor=#fefefe
| 141641 ||  || — || May 9, 2002 || Socorro || LINEAR || — || align=right | 1.0 km || 
|-id=642 bgcolor=#fefefe
| 141642 ||  || — || May 9, 2002 || Socorro || LINEAR || — || align=right | 1.3 km || 
|-id=643 bgcolor=#fefefe
| 141643 ||  || — || May 9, 2002 || Socorro || LINEAR || — || align=right data-sort-value="0.85" | 850 m || 
|-id=644 bgcolor=#fefefe
| 141644 ||  || — || May 9, 2002 || Socorro || LINEAR || — || align=right | 1.2 km || 
|-id=645 bgcolor=#fefefe
| 141645 ||  || — || May 9, 2002 || Socorro || LINEAR || FLO || align=right | 1.1 km || 
|-id=646 bgcolor=#fefefe
| 141646 ||  || — || May 8, 2002 || Socorro || LINEAR || FLO || align=right | 1.6 km || 
|-id=647 bgcolor=#fefefe
| 141647 ||  || — || May 8, 2002 || Socorro || LINEAR || FLO || align=right | 1.2 km || 
|-id=648 bgcolor=#fefefe
| 141648 ||  || — || May 9, 2002 || Socorro || LINEAR || NYS || align=right | 1.0 km || 
|-id=649 bgcolor=#fefefe
| 141649 ||  || — || May 9, 2002 || Socorro || LINEAR || — || align=right | 2.1 km || 
|-id=650 bgcolor=#fefefe
| 141650 ||  || — || May 9, 2002 || Socorro || LINEAR || — || align=right | 1.2 km || 
|-id=651 bgcolor=#fefefe
| 141651 ||  || — || May 9, 2002 || Socorro || LINEAR || — || align=right | 1.3 km || 
|-id=652 bgcolor=#fefefe
| 141652 ||  || — || May 8, 2002 || Socorro || LINEAR || — || align=right | 1.4 km || 
|-id=653 bgcolor=#fefefe
| 141653 ||  || — || May 8, 2002 || Socorro || LINEAR || — || align=right | 1.6 km || 
|-id=654 bgcolor=#fefefe
| 141654 ||  || — || May 8, 2002 || Socorro || LINEAR || FLO || align=right | 1.3 km || 
|-id=655 bgcolor=#fefefe
| 141655 ||  || — || May 8, 2002 || Socorro || LINEAR || — || align=right | 1.3 km || 
|-id=656 bgcolor=#fefefe
| 141656 ||  || — || May 8, 2002 || Socorro || LINEAR || — || align=right | 1.5 km || 
|-id=657 bgcolor=#fefefe
| 141657 ||  || — || May 10, 2002 || Socorro || LINEAR || — || align=right | 1.2 km || 
|-id=658 bgcolor=#fefefe
| 141658 ||  || — || May 11, 2002 || Socorro || LINEAR || — || align=right | 1.3 km || 
|-id=659 bgcolor=#fefefe
| 141659 ||  || — || May 11, 2002 || Socorro || LINEAR || V || align=right data-sort-value="0.94" | 940 m || 
|-id=660 bgcolor=#fefefe
| 141660 ||  || — || May 11, 2002 || Socorro || LINEAR || — || align=right | 1.2 km || 
|-id=661 bgcolor=#fefefe
| 141661 ||  || — || May 11, 2002 || Socorro || LINEAR || NYS || align=right | 1.00 km || 
|-id=662 bgcolor=#fefefe
| 141662 ||  || — || May 11, 2002 || Socorro || LINEAR || — || align=right data-sort-value="0.67" | 670 m || 
|-id=663 bgcolor=#fefefe
| 141663 ||  || — || May 11, 2002 || Socorro || LINEAR || — || align=right | 1.3 km || 
|-id=664 bgcolor=#fefefe
| 141664 ||  || — || May 11, 2002 || Socorro || LINEAR || — || align=right | 1.3 km || 
|-id=665 bgcolor=#fefefe
| 141665 ||  || — || May 11, 2002 || Socorro || LINEAR || FLO || align=right data-sort-value="0.81" | 810 m || 
|-id=666 bgcolor=#fefefe
| 141666 ||  || — || May 11, 2002 || Socorro || LINEAR || — || align=right | 1.0 km || 
|-id=667 bgcolor=#fefefe
| 141667 ||  || — || May 11, 2002 || Socorro || LINEAR || — || align=right | 1.2 km || 
|-id=668 bgcolor=#fefefe
| 141668 ||  || — || May 11, 2002 || Socorro || LINEAR || — || align=right | 1.4 km || 
|-id=669 bgcolor=#fefefe
| 141669 ||  || — || May 11, 2002 || Socorro || LINEAR || NYS || align=right data-sort-value="0.86" | 860 m || 
|-id=670 bgcolor=#FFC2E0
| 141670 ||  || — || May 15, 2002 || Socorro || LINEAR || AMO +1km || align=right | 1.6 km || 
|-id=671 bgcolor=#fefefe
| 141671 ||  || — || May 9, 2002 || Socorro || LINEAR || — || align=right | 1.3 km || 
|-id=672 bgcolor=#fefefe
| 141672 ||  || — || May 10, 2002 || Socorro || LINEAR || — || align=right data-sort-value="0.98" | 980 m || 
|-id=673 bgcolor=#fefefe
| 141673 ||  || — || May 12, 2002 || Socorro || LINEAR || — || align=right | 1.2 km || 
|-id=674 bgcolor=#fefefe
| 141674 ||  || — || May 12, 2002 || Socorro || LINEAR || FLO || align=right data-sort-value="0.94" | 940 m || 
|-id=675 bgcolor=#fefefe
| 141675 ||  || — || May 12, 2002 || Socorro || LINEAR || — || align=right | 1.5 km || 
|-id=676 bgcolor=#fefefe
| 141676 ||  || — || May 12, 2002 || Socorro || LINEAR || V || align=right | 1.1 km || 
|-id=677 bgcolor=#fefefe
| 141677 ||  || — || May 11, 2002 || Socorro || LINEAR || FLO || align=right | 1.1 km || 
|-id=678 bgcolor=#fefefe
| 141678 ||  || — || May 11, 2002 || Socorro || LINEAR || — || align=right | 1.5 km || 
|-id=679 bgcolor=#fefefe
| 141679 ||  || — || May 11, 2002 || Socorro || LINEAR || — || align=right | 1.4 km || 
|-id=680 bgcolor=#fefefe
| 141680 ||  || — || May 13, 2002 || Socorro || LINEAR || V || align=right | 1.1 km || 
|-id=681 bgcolor=#fefefe
| 141681 ||  || — || May 13, 2002 || Socorro || LINEAR || FLO || align=right | 1.0 km || 
|-id=682 bgcolor=#fefefe
| 141682 ||  || — || May 15, 2002 || Socorro || LINEAR || — || align=right | 1.2 km || 
|-id=683 bgcolor=#fefefe
| 141683 ||  || — || May 7, 2002 || Palomar || NEAT || — || align=right | 1.5 km || 
|-id=684 bgcolor=#fefefe
| 141684 ||  || — || May 7, 2002 || Palomar || NEAT || — || align=right | 1.6 km || 
|-id=685 bgcolor=#fefefe
| 141685 ||  || — || May 8, 2002 || Socorro || LINEAR || — || align=right | 1.2 km || 
|-id=686 bgcolor=#fefefe
| 141686 ||  || — || May 8, 2002 || Kitt Peak || Spacewatch || — || align=right data-sort-value="0.75" | 750 m || 
|-id=687 bgcolor=#fefefe
| 141687 ||  || — || May 9, 2002 || Socorro || LINEAR || FLO || align=right | 1.1 km || 
|-id=688 bgcolor=#fefefe
| 141688 ||  || — || May 9, 2002 || Socorro || LINEAR || — || align=right | 1.3 km || 
|-id=689 bgcolor=#fefefe
| 141689 ||  || — || May 10, 2002 || Palomar || NEAT || FLO || align=right | 1.1 km || 
|-id=690 bgcolor=#FA8072
| 141690 ||  || — || May 13, 2002 || Socorro || LINEAR || — || align=right | 1.1 km || 
|-id=691 bgcolor=#E9E9E9
| 141691 ||  || — || May 15, 2002 || Socorro || LINEAR || MAR || align=right | 1.8 km || 
|-id=692 bgcolor=#fefefe
| 141692 ||  || — || May 15, 2002 || Haleakala || NEAT || — || align=right | 1.1 km || 
|-id=693 bgcolor=#fefefe
| 141693 ||  || — || May 7, 2002 || Palomar || NEAT || V || align=right | 1.1 km || 
|-id=694 bgcolor=#fefefe
| 141694 ||  || — || May 11, 2002 || Socorro || LINEAR || — || align=right | 1.1 km || 
|-id=695 bgcolor=#fefefe
| 141695 ||  || — || May 18, 2002 || Palomar || NEAT || — || align=right data-sort-value="0.81" | 810 m || 
|-id=696 bgcolor=#fefefe
| 141696 ||  || — || May 18, 2002 || Socorro || LINEAR || PHO || align=right | 1.7 km || 
|-id=697 bgcolor=#fefefe
| 141697 ||  || — || May 16, 2002 || Socorro || LINEAR || — || align=right | 1.1 km || 
|-id=698 bgcolor=#fefefe
| 141698 ||  || — || May 29, 2002 || Haleakala || NEAT || — || align=right data-sort-value="0.96" | 960 m || 
|-id=699 bgcolor=#d6d6d6
| 141699 ||  || — || May 16, 2002 || Palomar || NEAT || — || align=right | 4.9 km || 
|-id=700 bgcolor=#fefefe
| 141700 ||  || — || May 17, 2002 || Palomar || NEAT || — || align=right | 1.4 km || 
|}

141701–141800 

|-bgcolor=#d6d6d6
| 141701 ||  || — || May 30, 2002 || Palomar || NEAT || SHU3:2 || align=right | 5.1 km || 
|-id=702 bgcolor=#fefefe
| 141702 ||  || — || June 5, 2002 || Socorro || LINEAR || — || align=right | 1.1 km || 
|-id=703 bgcolor=#fefefe
| 141703 ||  || — || June 5, 2002 || Socorro || LINEAR || FLO || align=right | 1.3 km || 
|-id=704 bgcolor=#fefefe
| 141704 ||  || — || June 5, 2002 || Socorro || LINEAR || V || align=right | 1.1 km || 
|-id=705 bgcolor=#fefefe
| 141705 ||  || — || June 4, 2002 || Palomar || NEAT || — || align=right | 1.4 km || 
|-id=706 bgcolor=#fefefe
| 141706 ||  || — || June 7, 2002 || Kitt Peak || Spacewatch || NYS || align=right | 1.6 km || 
|-id=707 bgcolor=#fefefe
| 141707 ||  || — || June 2, 2002 || Palomar || NEAT || V || align=right | 1.1 km || 
|-id=708 bgcolor=#fefefe
| 141708 ||  || — || June 6, 2002 || Socorro || LINEAR || NYS || align=right | 1.1 km || 
|-id=709 bgcolor=#fefefe
| 141709 ||  || — || June 5, 2002 || Socorro || LINEAR || FLO || align=right | 1.1 km || 
|-id=710 bgcolor=#fefefe
| 141710 ||  || — || June 5, 2002 || Socorro || LINEAR || — || align=right | 1.8 km || 
|-id=711 bgcolor=#fefefe
| 141711 ||  || — || June 5, 2002 || Socorro || LINEAR || — || align=right | 1.5 km || 
|-id=712 bgcolor=#fefefe
| 141712 ||  || — || June 5, 2002 || Socorro || LINEAR || — || align=right | 1.6 km || 
|-id=713 bgcolor=#fefefe
| 141713 ||  || — || June 5, 2002 || Socorro || LINEAR || FLO || align=right data-sort-value="0.89" | 890 m || 
|-id=714 bgcolor=#fefefe
| 141714 ||  || — || June 5, 2002 || Socorro || LINEAR || — || align=right | 1.6 km || 
|-id=715 bgcolor=#E9E9E9
| 141715 ||  || — || June 6, 2002 || Socorro || LINEAR || — || align=right | 2.6 km || 
|-id=716 bgcolor=#fefefe
| 141716 ||  || — || June 6, 2002 || Socorro || LINEAR || — || align=right | 1.1 km || 
|-id=717 bgcolor=#fefefe
| 141717 ||  || — || June 6, 2002 || Socorro || LINEAR || NYS || align=right data-sort-value="0.82" | 820 m || 
|-id=718 bgcolor=#fefefe
| 141718 ||  || — || June 6, 2002 || Socorro || LINEAR || — || align=right | 1.2 km || 
|-id=719 bgcolor=#fefefe
| 141719 ||  || — || June 6, 2002 || Socorro || LINEAR || — || align=right | 1.2 km || 
|-id=720 bgcolor=#fefefe
| 141720 ||  || — || June 6, 2002 || Socorro || LINEAR || — || align=right | 1.4 km || 
|-id=721 bgcolor=#fefefe
| 141721 ||  || — || June 6, 2002 || Socorro || LINEAR || MAS || align=right | 1.3 km || 
|-id=722 bgcolor=#fefefe
| 141722 ||  || — || June 6, 2002 || Socorro || LINEAR || FLO || align=right | 1.2 km || 
|-id=723 bgcolor=#fefefe
| 141723 ||  || — || June 6, 2002 || Socorro || LINEAR || — || align=right | 1.1 km || 
|-id=724 bgcolor=#fefefe
| 141724 ||  || — || June 6, 2002 || Socorro || LINEAR || — || align=right | 1.4 km || 
|-id=725 bgcolor=#fefefe
| 141725 ||  || — || June 8, 2002 || Socorro || LINEAR || — || align=right | 1.2 km || 
|-id=726 bgcolor=#fefefe
| 141726 ||  || — || June 8, 2002 || Socorro || LINEAR || MAS || align=right | 1.2 km || 
|-id=727 bgcolor=#fefefe
| 141727 ||  || — || June 8, 2002 || Socorro || LINEAR || — || align=right | 1.2 km || 
|-id=728 bgcolor=#fefefe
| 141728 ||  || — || June 8, 2002 || Socorro || LINEAR || — || align=right | 1.5 km || 
|-id=729 bgcolor=#fefefe
| 141729 ||  || — || June 8, 2002 || Socorro || LINEAR || — || align=right | 5.6 km || 
|-id=730 bgcolor=#fefefe
| 141730 ||  || — || June 8, 2002 || Socorro || LINEAR || — || align=right | 1.7 km || 
|-id=731 bgcolor=#fefefe
| 141731 ||  || — || June 9, 2002 || Desert Eagle || W. K. Y. Yeung || — || align=right | 1.3 km || 
|-id=732 bgcolor=#fefefe
| 141732 ||  || — || June 5, 2002 || Socorro || LINEAR || — || align=right | 1.6 km || 
|-id=733 bgcolor=#fefefe
| 141733 ||  || — || June 8, 2002 || Socorro || LINEAR || ERI || align=right | 2.6 km || 
|-id=734 bgcolor=#fefefe
| 141734 ||  || — || June 9, 2002 || Socorro || LINEAR || FLO || align=right | 1.2 km || 
|-id=735 bgcolor=#fefefe
| 141735 ||  || — || June 9, 2002 || Socorro || LINEAR || — || align=right | 1.4 km || 
|-id=736 bgcolor=#fefefe
| 141736 ||  || — || June 9, 2002 || Socorro || LINEAR || — || align=right | 1.5 km || 
|-id=737 bgcolor=#fefefe
| 141737 ||  || — || June 9, 2002 || Socorro || LINEAR || — || align=right | 1.6 km || 
|-id=738 bgcolor=#fefefe
| 141738 ||  || — || June 9, 2002 || Socorro || LINEAR || — || align=right | 1.5 km || 
|-id=739 bgcolor=#fefefe
| 141739 ||  || — || June 2, 2002 || Palomar || NEAT || FLO || align=right data-sort-value="0.95" | 950 m || 
|-id=740 bgcolor=#fefefe
| 141740 ||  || — || June 6, 2002 || Socorro || LINEAR || — || align=right | 1.6 km || 
|-id=741 bgcolor=#fefefe
| 141741 ||  || — || June 9, 2002 || Socorro || LINEAR || — || align=right | 2.3 km || 
|-id=742 bgcolor=#FA8072
| 141742 ||  || — || June 9, 2002 || Socorro || LINEAR || — || align=right | 1.8 km || 
|-id=743 bgcolor=#fefefe
| 141743 ||  || — || June 10, 2002 || Socorro || LINEAR || V || align=right | 1.1 km || 
|-id=744 bgcolor=#fefefe
| 141744 ||  || — || June 12, 2002 || Socorro || LINEAR || H || align=right | 1.0 km || 
|-id=745 bgcolor=#fefefe
| 141745 ||  || — || June 10, 2002 || Socorro || LINEAR || PHO || align=right | 1.5 km || 
|-id=746 bgcolor=#fefefe
| 141746 ||  || — || June 4, 2002 || Palomar || NEAT || NYS || align=right data-sort-value="0.93" | 930 m || 
|-id=747 bgcolor=#fefefe
| 141747 ||  || — || June 6, 2002 || Kitt Peak || Spacewatch || FLO || align=right | 1.2 km || 
|-id=748 bgcolor=#fefefe
| 141748 ||  || — || June 11, 2002 || Socorro || LINEAR || — || align=right | 1.6 km || 
|-id=749 bgcolor=#fefefe
| 141749 ||  || — || June 13, 2002 || Socorro || LINEAR || — || align=right | 1.7 km || 
|-id=750 bgcolor=#fefefe
| 141750 ||  || — || June 8, 2002 || Haleakala || NEAT || — || align=right | 1.2 km || 
|-id=751 bgcolor=#E9E9E9
| 141751 ||  || — || June 9, 2002 || Socorro || LINEAR || — || align=right | 3.2 km || 
|-id=752 bgcolor=#fefefe
| 141752 ||  || — || June 9, 2002 || Socorro || LINEAR || — || align=right | 2.2 km || 
|-id=753 bgcolor=#FA8072
| 141753 ||  || — || June 9, 2002 || Palomar || NEAT || — || align=right | 1.4 km || 
|-id=754 bgcolor=#fefefe
| 141754 ||  || — || June 10, 2002 || Socorro || LINEAR || — || align=right | 1.4 km || 
|-id=755 bgcolor=#fefefe
| 141755 ||  || — || June 11, 2002 || Socorro || LINEAR || — || align=right | 1.3 km || 
|-id=756 bgcolor=#FA8072
| 141756 ||  || — || June 8, 2002 || Haleakala || NEAT || — || align=right | 1.7 km || 
|-id=757 bgcolor=#fefefe
| 141757 ||  || — || June 8, 2002 || Socorro || LINEAR || V || align=right | 1.1 km || 
|-id=758 bgcolor=#fefefe
| 141758 ||  || — || June 12, 2002 || Socorro || LINEAR || — || align=right | 1.5 km || 
|-id=759 bgcolor=#fefefe
| 141759 ||  || — || June 11, 2002 || Palomar || NEAT || — || align=right | 1.1 km || 
|-id=760 bgcolor=#fefefe
| 141760 ||  || — || June 11, 2002 || Palomar || NEAT || — || align=right | 1.2 km || 
|-id=761 bgcolor=#FFC2E0
| 141761 || 2002 MC || — || June 16, 2002 || Socorro || LINEAR || AMO +1km || align=right | 1.3 km || 
|-id=762 bgcolor=#fefefe
| 141762 || 2002 MR || — || June 18, 2002 || Reedy Creek || J. Broughton || NYS || align=right | 1.1 km || 
|-id=763 bgcolor=#fefefe
| 141763 ||  || — || June 19, 2002 || Socorro || LINEAR || PHO || align=right | 1.6 km || 
|-id=764 bgcolor=#fefefe
| 141764 ||  || — || June 16, 2002 || Palomar || NEAT || — || align=right | 1.2 km || 
|-id=765 bgcolor=#FFC2E0
| 141765 ||  || — || June 30, 2002 || Palomar || NEAT || AMO +1km || align=right | 1.9 km || 
|-id=766 bgcolor=#fefefe
| 141766 ||  || — || June 17, 2002 || Palomar || NEAT || NYS || align=right data-sort-value="0.99" | 990 m || 
|-id=767 bgcolor=#fefefe
| 141767 ||  || — || July 4, 2002 || Palomar || NEAT || MAS || align=right | 1.4 km || 
|-id=768 bgcolor=#fefefe
| 141768 ||  || — || July 4, 2002 || Palomar || NEAT || V || align=right | 1.3 km || 
|-id=769 bgcolor=#d6d6d6
| 141769 ||  || — || July 6, 2002 || Palomar || NEAT || — || align=right | 5.8 km || 
|-id=770 bgcolor=#fefefe
| 141770 ||  || — || July 8, 2002 || Reedy Creek || J. Broughton || NYS || align=right | 1.1 km || 
|-id=771 bgcolor=#fefefe
| 141771 ||  || — || July 1, 2002 || Palomar || NEAT || NYS || align=right data-sort-value="0.85" | 850 m || 
|-id=772 bgcolor=#fefefe
| 141772 ||  || — || July 10, 2002 || Campo Imperatore || CINEOS || — || align=right | 1.3 km || 
|-id=773 bgcolor=#fefefe
| 141773 ||  || — || July 8, 2002 || Palomar || NEAT || V || align=right | 1.1 km || 
|-id=774 bgcolor=#fefefe
| 141774 ||  || — || July 9, 2002 || Socorro || LINEAR || LCI || align=right | 1.5 km || 
|-id=775 bgcolor=#fefefe
| 141775 ||  || — || July 1, 2002 || Palomar || NEAT || — || align=right | 1.5 km || 
|-id=776 bgcolor=#FA8072
| 141776 ||  || — || July 1, 2002 || Palomar || NEAT || — || align=right | 1.5 km || 
|-id=777 bgcolor=#fefefe
| 141777 ||  || — || July 4, 2002 || Palomar || NEAT || NYS || align=right | 1.2 km || 
|-id=778 bgcolor=#fefefe
| 141778 ||  || — || July 4, 2002 || Palomar || NEAT || NYS || align=right | 1.0 km || 
|-id=779 bgcolor=#fefefe
| 141779 ||  || — || July 4, 2002 || Palomar || NEAT || NYS || align=right | 1.0 km || 
|-id=780 bgcolor=#fefefe
| 141780 ||  || — || July 4, 2002 || Kitt Peak || Spacewatch || NYS || align=right | 1.2 km || 
|-id=781 bgcolor=#fefefe
| 141781 ||  || — || July 4, 2002 || Palomar || NEAT || — || align=right | 1.4 km || 
|-id=782 bgcolor=#fefefe
| 141782 ||  || — || July 4, 2002 || Palomar || NEAT || NYS || align=right | 1.3 km || 
|-id=783 bgcolor=#fefefe
| 141783 ||  || — || July 4, 2002 || Palomar || NEAT || NYS || align=right data-sort-value="0.93" | 930 m || 
|-id=784 bgcolor=#fefefe
| 141784 ||  || — || July 4, 2002 || Palomar || NEAT || — || align=right | 2.6 km || 
|-id=785 bgcolor=#fefefe
| 141785 ||  || — || July 4, 2002 || Palomar || NEAT || NYS || align=right | 1.1 km || 
|-id=786 bgcolor=#fefefe
| 141786 ||  || — || July 5, 2002 || Socorro || LINEAR || — || align=right | 1.1 km || 
|-id=787 bgcolor=#d6d6d6
| 141787 ||  || — || July 9, 2002 || Socorro || LINEAR || EOS || align=right | 4.3 km || 
|-id=788 bgcolor=#fefefe
| 141788 ||  || — || July 9, 2002 || Socorro || LINEAR || V || align=right data-sort-value="0.95" | 950 m || 
|-id=789 bgcolor=#d6d6d6
| 141789 ||  || — || July 9, 2002 || Socorro || LINEAR || HYG || align=right | 6.1 km || 
|-id=790 bgcolor=#fefefe
| 141790 ||  || — || July 9, 2002 || Socorro || LINEAR || — || align=right | 1.2 km || 
|-id=791 bgcolor=#fefefe
| 141791 ||  || — || July 9, 2002 || Socorro || LINEAR || — || align=right | 1.4 km || 
|-id=792 bgcolor=#fefefe
| 141792 ||  || — || July 9, 2002 || Socorro || LINEAR || — || align=right | 1.0 km || 
|-id=793 bgcolor=#fefefe
| 141793 ||  || — || July 9, 2002 || Socorro || LINEAR || — || align=right | 1.3 km || 
|-id=794 bgcolor=#fefefe
| 141794 ||  || — || July 9, 2002 || Socorro || LINEAR || — || align=right | 1.1 km || 
|-id=795 bgcolor=#fefefe
| 141795 ||  || — || July 9, 2002 || Socorro || LINEAR || — || align=right | 1.4 km || 
|-id=796 bgcolor=#fefefe
| 141796 ||  || — || July 9, 2002 || Socorro || LINEAR || V || align=right | 1.4 km || 
|-id=797 bgcolor=#fefefe
| 141797 ||  || — || July 13, 2002 || Haleakala || NEAT || — || align=right | 1.7 km || 
|-id=798 bgcolor=#E9E9E9
| 141798 ||  || — || July 6, 2002 || Anderson Mesa || LONEOS || — || align=right | 1.9 km || 
|-id=799 bgcolor=#fefefe
| 141799 ||  || — || July 9, 2002 || Palomar || NEAT || — || align=right | 1.00 km || 
|-id=800 bgcolor=#E9E9E9
| 141800 ||  || — || July 14, 2002 || Socorro || LINEAR || EUN || align=right | 2.3 km || 
|}

141801–141900 

|-bgcolor=#fefefe
| 141801 ||  || — || July 9, 2002 || Socorro || LINEAR || — || align=right | 1.4 km || 
|-id=802 bgcolor=#fefefe
| 141802 ||  || — || July 9, 2002 || Socorro || LINEAR || V || align=right data-sort-value="0.86" | 860 m || 
|-id=803 bgcolor=#fefefe
| 141803 ||  || — || July 9, 2002 || Socorro || LINEAR || V || align=right | 1.2 km || 
|-id=804 bgcolor=#fefefe
| 141804 ||  || — || July 9, 2002 || Socorro || LINEAR || — || align=right | 1.7 km || 
|-id=805 bgcolor=#fefefe
| 141805 ||  || — || July 9, 2002 || Socorro || LINEAR || — || align=right | 1.4 km || 
|-id=806 bgcolor=#fefefe
| 141806 ||  || — || July 9, 2002 || Socorro || LINEAR || — || align=right | 2.2 km || 
|-id=807 bgcolor=#fefefe
| 141807 ||  || — || July 9, 2002 || Socorro || LINEAR || — || align=right | 3.5 km || 
|-id=808 bgcolor=#FA8072
| 141808 ||  || — || July 14, 2002 || Socorro || LINEAR || — || align=right | 1.7 km || 
|-id=809 bgcolor=#fefefe
| 141809 ||  || — || July 11, 2002 || Socorro || LINEAR || — || align=right | 3.6 km || 
|-id=810 bgcolor=#fefefe
| 141810 ||  || — || July 14, 2002 || Palomar || NEAT || — || align=right | 1.2 km || 
|-id=811 bgcolor=#fefefe
| 141811 ||  || — || July 14, 2002 || Palomar || NEAT || NYS || align=right data-sort-value="0.93" | 930 m || 
|-id=812 bgcolor=#fefefe
| 141812 ||  || — || July 15, 2002 || Palomar || NEAT || FLO || align=right | 1.2 km || 
|-id=813 bgcolor=#fefefe
| 141813 ||  || — || July 12, 2002 || Palomar || NEAT || V || align=right | 1.3 km || 
|-id=814 bgcolor=#fefefe
| 141814 ||  || — || July 12, 2002 || Palomar || NEAT || — || align=right | 1.1 km || 
|-id=815 bgcolor=#fefefe
| 141815 ||  || — || July 12, 2002 || Palomar || NEAT || — || align=right | 1.6 km || 
|-id=816 bgcolor=#fefefe
| 141816 ||  || — || July 13, 2002 || Palomar || NEAT || NYS || align=right data-sort-value="0.99" | 990 m || 
|-id=817 bgcolor=#fefefe
| 141817 ||  || — || July 13, 2002 || Palomar || NEAT || — || align=right | 1.6 km || 
|-id=818 bgcolor=#fefefe
| 141818 ||  || — || July 13, 2002 || Palomar || NEAT || — || align=right | 1.0 km || 
|-id=819 bgcolor=#fefefe
| 141819 ||  || — || July 14, 2002 || Palomar || NEAT || V || align=right | 1.1 km || 
|-id=820 bgcolor=#fefefe
| 141820 ||  || — || July 4, 2002 || Palomar || NEAT || NYS || align=right | 1.2 km || 
|-id=821 bgcolor=#fefefe
| 141821 ||  || — || July 5, 2002 || Socorro || LINEAR || — || align=right | 1.6 km || 
|-id=822 bgcolor=#fefefe
| 141822 ||  || — || July 14, 2002 || Palomar || NEAT || — || align=right | 1.2 km || 
|-id=823 bgcolor=#fefefe
| 141823 ||  || — || July 14, 2002 || Palomar || NEAT || NYS || align=right | 1.1 km || 
|-id=824 bgcolor=#fefefe
| 141824 ||  || — || July 14, 2002 || Palomar || NEAT || — || align=right | 1.0 km || 
|-id=825 bgcolor=#fefefe
| 141825 ||  || — || July 5, 2002 || Socorro || LINEAR || V || align=right | 1.2 km || 
|-id=826 bgcolor=#fefefe
| 141826 ||  || — || July 5, 2002 || Socorro || LINEAR || — || align=right | 1.7 km || 
|-id=827 bgcolor=#fefefe
| 141827 ||  || — || July 5, 2002 || Socorro || LINEAR || — || align=right | 1.3 km || 
|-id=828 bgcolor=#fefefe
| 141828 ||  || — || July 8, 2002 || Palomar || NEAT || NYS || align=right | 1.0 km || 
|-id=829 bgcolor=#fefefe
| 141829 || 2002 OC || — || July 16, 2002 || Reedy Creek || J. Broughton || — || align=right | 1.5 km || 
|-id=830 bgcolor=#fefefe
| 141830 || 2002 OH || — || July 16, 2002 || Palomar || NEAT || — || align=right | 1.4 km || 
|-id=831 bgcolor=#fefefe
| 141831 ||  || — || July 17, 2002 || Palomar || NEAT || V || align=right data-sort-value="0.95" | 950 m || 
|-id=832 bgcolor=#fefefe
| 141832 ||  || — || July 18, 2002 || Palomar || NEAT || — || align=right | 1.2 km || 
|-id=833 bgcolor=#fefefe
| 141833 ||  || — || July 19, 2002 || Palomar || NEAT || — || align=right | 1.5 km || 
|-id=834 bgcolor=#fefefe
| 141834 ||  || — || July 21, 2002 || Palomar || NEAT || — || align=right | 1.9 km || 
|-id=835 bgcolor=#fefefe
| 141835 ||  || — || July 22, 2002 || Palomar || NEAT || NYS || align=right | 1.00 km || 
|-id=836 bgcolor=#fefefe
| 141836 ||  || — || July 18, 2002 || Socorro || LINEAR || — || align=right | 1.3 km || 
|-id=837 bgcolor=#fefefe
| 141837 ||  || — || July 18, 2002 || Socorro || LINEAR || V || align=right | 1.1 km || 
|-id=838 bgcolor=#fefefe
| 141838 ||  || — || July 18, 2002 || Socorro || LINEAR || — || align=right | 1.4 km || 
|-id=839 bgcolor=#fefefe
| 141839 ||  || — || July 22, 2002 || Palomar || NEAT || NYS || align=right | 1.3 km || 
|-id=840 bgcolor=#fefefe
| 141840 ||  || — || July 22, 2002 || Palomar || NEAT || NYS || align=right | 1.2 km || 
|-id=841 bgcolor=#fefefe
| 141841 ||  || — || July 22, 2002 || Palomar || NEAT || — || align=right | 1.6 km || 
|-id=842 bgcolor=#fefefe
| 141842 ||  || — || July 18, 2002 || Palomar || NEAT || MAS || align=right | 1.1 km || 
|-id=843 bgcolor=#fefefe
| 141843 ||  || — || July 22, 2002 || Palomar || NEAT || — || align=right | 1.2 km || 
|-id=844 bgcolor=#fefefe
| 141844 ||  || — || July 31, 2002 || Reedy Creek || J. Broughton || NYS || align=right | 1.5 km || 
|-id=845 bgcolor=#fefefe
| 141845 ||  || — || July 26, 2002 || Palomar || NEAT || FLO || align=right data-sort-value="0.88" | 880 m || 
|-id=846 bgcolor=#fefefe
| 141846 ||  || — || July 17, 2002 || Palomar || NEAT || — || align=right | 1.5 km || 
|-id=847 bgcolor=#fefefe
| 141847 ||  || — || July 30, 2002 || Haleakala || NEAT || V || align=right | 1.2 km || 
|-id=848 bgcolor=#fefefe
| 141848 ||  || — || July 18, 2002 || Palomar || NEAT || — || align=right data-sort-value="0.93" | 930 m || 
|-id=849 bgcolor=#fefefe
| 141849 || 2002 PC || — || August 1, 2002 || Reedy Creek || J. Broughton || — || align=right | 1.7 km || 
|-id=850 bgcolor=#E9E9E9
| 141850 ||  || — || August 4, 2002 || Palomar || NEAT || — || align=right | 3.9 km || 
|-id=851 bgcolor=#FFC2E0
| 141851 ||  || — || August 6, 2002 || Socorro || LINEAR || APO +1kmPHA || align=right | 1.0 km || 
|-id=852 bgcolor=#fefefe
| 141852 ||  || — || August 5, 2002 || Palomar || NEAT || — || align=right | 1.2 km || 
|-id=853 bgcolor=#fefefe
| 141853 ||  || — || August 5, 2002 || Palomar || NEAT || — || align=right | 1.4 km || 
|-id=854 bgcolor=#fefefe
| 141854 ||  || — || August 5, 2002 || Palomar || NEAT || FLO || align=right | 1.3 km || 
|-id=855 bgcolor=#fefefe
| 141855 ||  || — || August 5, 2002 || Palomar || NEAT || V || align=right | 1.1 km || 
|-id=856 bgcolor=#fefefe
| 141856 ||  || — || August 3, 2002 || Palomar || NEAT || — || align=right | 1.2 km || 
|-id=857 bgcolor=#fefefe
| 141857 ||  || — || August 6, 2002 || Palomar || NEAT || V || align=right | 1.2 km || 
|-id=858 bgcolor=#fefefe
| 141858 ||  || — || August 6, 2002 || Palomar || NEAT || NYS || align=right | 1.1 km || 
|-id=859 bgcolor=#fefefe
| 141859 ||  || — || August 6, 2002 || Palomar || NEAT || NYS || align=right data-sort-value="0.87" | 870 m || 
|-id=860 bgcolor=#fefefe
| 141860 ||  || — || August 6, 2002 || Palomar || NEAT || — || align=right data-sort-value="0.87" | 870 m || 
|-id=861 bgcolor=#fefefe
| 141861 ||  || — || August 6, 2002 || Palomar || NEAT || V || align=right data-sort-value="0.95" | 950 m || 
|-id=862 bgcolor=#fefefe
| 141862 ||  || — || August 6, 2002 || Palomar || NEAT || NYS || align=right | 1.1 km || 
|-id=863 bgcolor=#fefefe
| 141863 ||  || — || August 6, 2002 || Palomar || NEAT || MAS || align=right | 1.2 km || 
|-id=864 bgcolor=#fefefe
| 141864 ||  || — || August 6, 2002 || Palomar || NEAT || NYS || align=right | 1.0 km || 
|-id=865 bgcolor=#fefefe
| 141865 ||  || — || August 6, 2002 || Palomar || NEAT || V || align=right | 1.4 km || 
|-id=866 bgcolor=#fefefe
| 141866 ||  || — || August 6, 2002 || Palomar || NEAT || SUL || align=right | 2.9 km || 
|-id=867 bgcolor=#fefefe
| 141867 ||  || — || August 6, 2002 || Palomar || NEAT || NYS || align=right data-sort-value="0.94" | 940 m || 
|-id=868 bgcolor=#fefefe
| 141868 ||  || — || August 6, 2002 || Palomar || NEAT || — || align=right | 1.3 km || 
|-id=869 bgcolor=#fefefe
| 141869 ||  || — || August 6, 2002 || Palomar || NEAT || NYS || align=right | 1.1 km || 
|-id=870 bgcolor=#fefefe
| 141870 ||  || — || August 6, 2002 || Palomar || NEAT || FLO || align=right data-sort-value="0.88" | 880 m || 
|-id=871 bgcolor=#fefefe
| 141871 ||  || — || August 6, 2002 || Campo Imperatore || CINEOS || MAS || align=right | 1.1 km || 
|-id=872 bgcolor=#fefefe
| 141872 ||  || — || August 6, 2002 || Campo Imperatore || CINEOS || NYS || align=right | 1.6 km || 
|-id=873 bgcolor=#E9E9E9
| 141873 ||  || — || August 4, 2002 || Socorro || LINEAR || BAR || align=right | 3.0 km || 
|-id=874 bgcolor=#FFC2E0
| 141874 ||  || — || August 6, 2002 || Palomar || NEAT || AMO +1km || align=right | 1.0 km || 
|-id=875 bgcolor=#fefefe
| 141875 ||  || — || August 6, 2002 || Palomar || NEAT || MAS || align=right | 1.1 km || 
|-id=876 bgcolor=#fefefe
| 141876 ||  || — || August 6, 2002 || Palomar || NEAT || — || align=right data-sort-value="0.99" | 990 m || 
|-id=877 bgcolor=#fefefe
| 141877 ||  || — || August 6, 2002 || Palomar || NEAT || NYS || align=right | 1.2 km || 
|-id=878 bgcolor=#fefefe
| 141878 ||  || — || August 5, 2002 || Socorro || LINEAR || — || align=right | 1.9 km || 
|-id=879 bgcolor=#fefefe
| 141879 ||  || — || August 10, 2002 || Socorro || LINEAR || V || align=right | 1.1 km || 
|-id=880 bgcolor=#E9E9E9
| 141880 ||  || — || August 10, 2002 || Socorro || LINEAR || EUN || align=right | 2.4 km || 
|-id=881 bgcolor=#fefefe
| 141881 ||  || — || August 10, 2002 || Socorro || LINEAR || V || align=right | 1.3 km || 
|-id=882 bgcolor=#E9E9E9
| 141882 ||  || — || August 10, 2002 || Socorro || LINEAR || — || align=right | 2.7 km || 
|-id=883 bgcolor=#E9E9E9
| 141883 ||  || — || August 10, 2002 || Socorro || LINEAR || MIT || align=right | 4.5 km || 
|-id=884 bgcolor=#fefefe
| 141884 ||  || — || August 8, 2002 || Palomar || NEAT || V || align=right | 1.3 km || 
|-id=885 bgcolor=#fefefe
| 141885 ||  || — || August 8, 2002 || Palomar || NEAT || NYS || align=right | 1.3 km || 
|-id=886 bgcolor=#fefefe
| 141886 ||  || — || August 8, 2002 || Palomar || NEAT || MAS || align=right | 1.2 km || 
|-id=887 bgcolor=#fefefe
| 141887 ||  || — || August 8, 2002 || Palomar || NEAT || — || align=right | 1.4 km || 
|-id=888 bgcolor=#fefefe
| 141888 ||  || — || August 8, 2002 || Palomar || NEAT || MAS || align=right | 1.2 km || 
|-id=889 bgcolor=#E9E9E9
| 141889 ||  || — || August 5, 2002 || Socorro || LINEAR || — || align=right | 3.4 km || 
|-id=890 bgcolor=#fefefe
| 141890 ||  || — || August 9, 2002 || Socorro || LINEAR || NYS || align=right | 1.2 km || 
|-id=891 bgcolor=#fefefe
| 141891 ||  || — || August 9, 2002 || Socorro || LINEAR || V || align=right | 1.2 km || 
|-id=892 bgcolor=#fefefe
| 141892 ||  || — || August 9, 2002 || Socorro || LINEAR || V || align=right | 1.1 km || 
|-id=893 bgcolor=#fefefe
| 141893 ||  || — || August 9, 2002 || Socorro || LINEAR || FLO || align=right | 1.0 km || 
|-id=894 bgcolor=#fefefe
| 141894 ||  || — || August 9, 2002 || Socorro || LINEAR || V || align=right | 1.4 km || 
|-id=895 bgcolor=#fefefe
| 141895 ||  || — || August 9, 2002 || Socorro || LINEAR || — || align=right | 1.6 km || 
|-id=896 bgcolor=#fefefe
| 141896 ||  || — || August 9, 2002 || Socorro || LINEAR || V || align=right | 1.7 km || 
|-id=897 bgcolor=#fefefe
| 141897 ||  || — || August 10, 2002 || Socorro || LINEAR || NYS || align=right | 1.6 km || 
|-id=898 bgcolor=#fefefe
| 141898 ||  || — || August 8, 2002 || Palomar || NEAT || NYS || align=right | 1.5 km || 
|-id=899 bgcolor=#fefefe
| 141899 ||  || — || August 8, 2002 || Palomar || NEAT || — || align=right | 1.3 km || 
|-id=900 bgcolor=#fefefe
| 141900 ||  || — || August 3, 2002 || Palomar || NEAT || — || align=right | 1.2 km || 
|}

141901–142000 

|-bgcolor=#fefefe
| 141901 ||  || — || August 5, 2002 || Palomar || NEAT || — || align=right | 1.3 km || 
|-id=902 bgcolor=#fefefe
| 141902 ||  || — || August 6, 2002 || Palomar || NEAT || — || align=right | 1.2 km || 
|-id=903 bgcolor=#fefefe
| 141903 ||  || — || August 6, 2002 || Palomar || NEAT || V || align=right | 1.1 km || 
|-id=904 bgcolor=#E9E9E9
| 141904 ||  || — || August 11, 2002 || Socorro || LINEAR || MIT || align=right | 4.0 km || 
|-id=905 bgcolor=#d6d6d6
| 141905 ||  || — || August 12, 2002 || Socorro || LINEAR || — || align=right | 4.9 km || 
|-id=906 bgcolor=#fefefe
| 141906 ||  || — || August 12, 2002 || Socorro || LINEAR || FLO || align=right | 1.2 km || 
|-id=907 bgcolor=#fefefe
| 141907 ||  || — || August 12, 2002 || Socorro || LINEAR || NYS || align=right | 1.3 km || 
|-id=908 bgcolor=#fefefe
| 141908 ||  || — || August 11, 2002 || Palomar || NEAT || V || align=right | 1.0 km || 
|-id=909 bgcolor=#fefefe
| 141909 ||  || — || August 11, 2002 || Palomar || NEAT || FLO || align=right | 1.3 km || 
|-id=910 bgcolor=#fefefe
| 141910 ||  || — || August 11, 2002 || Palomar || NEAT || FLO || align=right data-sort-value="0.87" | 870 m || 
|-id=911 bgcolor=#fefefe
| 141911 ||  || — || August 13, 2002 || Fountain Hills || C. W. Juels, P. R. Holvorcem || — || align=right | 1.6 km || 
|-id=912 bgcolor=#fefefe
| 141912 ||  || — || August 11, 2002 || Palomar || NEAT || V || align=right | 1.2 km || 
|-id=913 bgcolor=#fefefe
| 141913 ||  || — || August 11, 2002 || Palomar || NEAT || NYS || align=right data-sort-value="0.93" | 930 m || 
|-id=914 bgcolor=#d6d6d6
| 141914 ||  || — || August 11, 2002 || Palomar || NEAT || KOR || align=right | 2.2 km || 
|-id=915 bgcolor=#fefefe
| 141915 ||  || — || August 11, 2002 || Palomar || NEAT || — || align=right | 3.3 km || 
|-id=916 bgcolor=#fefefe
| 141916 ||  || — || August 9, 2002 || Socorro || LINEAR || — || align=right | 1.2 km || 
|-id=917 bgcolor=#fefefe
| 141917 ||  || — || August 9, 2002 || Socorro || LINEAR || — || align=right | 1.4 km || 
|-id=918 bgcolor=#fefefe
| 141918 ||  || — || August 10, 2002 || Socorro || LINEAR || NYS || align=right | 4.0 km || 
|-id=919 bgcolor=#fefefe
| 141919 ||  || — || August 10, 2002 || Socorro || LINEAR || NYS || align=right | 1.4 km || 
|-id=920 bgcolor=#fefefe
| 141920 ||  || — || August 10, 2002 || Socorro || LINEAR || NYS || align=right | 1.3 km || 
|-id=921 bgcolor=#E9E9E9
| 141921 ||  || — || August 10, 2002 || Socorro || LINEAR || — || align=right | 2.3 km || 
|-id=922 bgcolor=#fefefe
| 141922 ||  || — || August 10, 2002 || Socorro || LINEAR || NYS || align=right | 1.4 km || 
|-id=923 bgcolor=#fefefe
| 141923 ||  || — || August 10, 2002 || Socorro || LINEAR || NYS || align=right | 1.5 km || 
|-id=924 bgcolor=#fefefe
| 141924 ||  || — || August 10, 2002 || Socorro || LINEAR || NYS || align=right | 1.3 km || 
|-id=925 bgcolor=#fefefe
| 141925 ||  || — || August 13, 2002 || Socorro || LINEAR || — || align=right | 1.4 km || 
|-id=926 bgcolor=#fefefe
| 141926 ||  || — || August 14, 2002 || Reedy Creek || J. Broughton || NYS || align=right | 1.3 km || 
|-id=927 bgcolor=#fefefe
| 141927 ||  || — || August 13, 2002 || El Centro || W. K. Y. Yeung || NYS || align=right | 1.3 km || 
|-id=928 bgcolor=#fefefe
| 141928 ||  || — || August 4, 2002 || Palomar || NEAT || — || align=right | 1.4 km || 
|-id=929 bgcolor=#fefefe
| 141929 ||  || — || August 12, 2002 || Socorro || LINEAR || MAS || align=right | 1.1 km || 
|-id=930 bgcolor=#fefefe
| 141930 ||  || — || August 12, 2002 || Socorro || LINEAR || — || align=right | 1.6 km || 
|-id=931 bgcolor=#fefefe
| 141931 ||  || — || August 14, 2002 || Socorro || LINEAR || V || align=right | 1.3 km || 
|-id=932 bgcolor=#fefefe
| 141932 ||  || — || August 11, 2002 || Haleakala || NEAT || NYS || align=right data-sort-value="0.96" | 960 m || 
|-id=933 bgcolor=#fefefe
| 141933 ||  || — || August 11, 2002 || Haleakala || NEAT || — || align=right | 1.9 km || 
|-id=934 bgcolor=#fefefe
| 141934 ||  || — || August 12, 2002 || Socorro || LINEAR || — || align=right | 1.2 km || 
|-id=935 bgcolor=#fefefe
| 141935 ||  || — || August 12, 2002 || Haleakala || NEAT || — || align=right | 3.2 km || 
|-id=936 bgcolor=#fefefe
| 141936 ||  || — || August 14, 2002 || Socorro || LINEAR || NYS || align=right | 1.1 km || 
|-id=937 bgcolor=#fefefe
| 141937 ||  || — || August 14, 2002 || Socorro || LINEAR || — || align=right | 1.6 km || 
|-id=938 bgcolor=#fefefe
| 141938 ||  || — || August 14, 2002 || Socorro || LINEAR || NYS || align=right | 1.2 km || 
|-id=939 bgcolor=#fefefe
| 141939 ||  || — || August 14, 2002 || Socorro || LINEAR || MAS || align=right | 1.2 km || 
|-id=940 bgcolor=#fefefe
| 141940 ||  || — || August 14, 2002 || Socorro || LINEAR || — || align=right | 1.6 km || 
|-id=941 bgcolor=#fefefe
| 141941 ||  || — || August 14, 2002 || Socorro || LINEAR || — || align=right | 1.5 km || 
|-id=942 bgcolor=#fefefe
| 141942 ||  || — || August 14, 2002 || Socorro || LINEAR || NYS || align=right | 1.0 km || 
|-id=943 bgcolor=#fefefe
| 141943 ||  || — || August 14, 2002 || Socorro || LINEAR || — || align=right | 1.7 km || 
|-id=944 bgcolor=#d6d6d6
| 141944 ||  || — || August 12, 2002 || Socorro || LINEAR || — || align=right | 4.0 km || 
|-id=945 bgcolor=#fefefe
| 141945 ||  || — || August 12, 2002 || Socorro || LINEAR || — || align=right | 1.5 km || 
|-id=946 bgcolor=#fefefe
| 141946 ||  || — || August 12, 2002 || Anderson Mesa || LONEOS || — || align=right data-sort-value="0.90" | 900 m || 
|-id=947 bgcolor=#fefefe
| 141947 ||  || — || August 13, 2002 || Socorro || LINEAR || — || align=right | 1.3 km || 
|-id=948 bgcolor=#fefefe
| 141948 ||  || — || August 13, 2002 || Socorro || LINEAR || V || align=right | 1.2 km || 
|-id=949 bgcolor=#d6d6d6
| 141949 ||  || — || August 13, 2002 || Anderson Mesa || LONEOS || EOS || align=right | 6.6 km || 
|-id=950 bgcolor=#fefefe
| 141950 ||  || — || August 13, 2002 || Anderson Mesa || LONEOS || — || align=right | 1.3 km || 
|-id=951 bgcolor=#fefefe
| 141951 ||  || — || August 14, 2002 || Palomar || NEAT || — || align=right | 1.4 km || 
|-id=952 bgcolor=#fefefe
| 141952 ||  || — || August 14, 2002 || Socorro || LINEAR || V || align=right | 1.2 km || 
|-id=953 bgcolor=#fefefe
| 141953 ||  || — || August 12, 2002 || Socorro || LINEAR || MAS || align=right | 1.2 km || 
|-id=954 bgcolor=#fefefe
| 141954 ||  || — || August 12, 2002 || Anderson Mesa || LONEOS || MAS || align=right | 1.2 km || 
|-id=955 bgcolor=#fefefe
| 141955 ||  || — || August 13, 2002 || Anderson Mesa || LONEOS || PHO || align=right | 1.7 km || 
|-id=956 bgcolor=#E9E9E9
| 141956 ||  || — || August 13, 2002 || Socorro || LINEAR || MIT || align=right | 4.6 km || 
|-id=957 bgcolor=#fefefe
| 141957 ||  || — || August 14, 2002 || Anderson Mesa || LONEOS || — || align=right | 1.5 km || 
|-id=958 bgcolor=#fefefe
| 141958 ||  || — || August 14, 2002 || Anderson Mesa || LONEOS || ERI || align=right | 2.5 km || 
|-id=959 bgcolor=#fefefe
| 141959 ||  || — || August 12, 2002 || Haleakala || NEAT || NYS || align=right data-sort-value="0.90" | 900 m || 
|-id=960 bgcolor=#fefefe
| 141960 ||  || — || August 13, 2002 || Anderson Mesa || LONEOS || V || align=right | 1.1 km || 
|-id=961 bgcolor=#fefefe
| 141961 ||  || — || August 13, 2002 || Anderson Mesa || LONEOS || V || align=right | 1.1 km || 
|-id=962 bgcolor=#fefefe
| 141962 ||  || — || August 13, 2002 || Anderson Mesa || LONEOS || V || align=right data-sort-value="0.84" | 840 m || 
|-id=963 bgcolor=#fefefe
| 141963 ||  || — || August 13, 2002 || Anderson Mesa || LONEOS || V || align=right | 1.4 km || 
|-id=964 bgcolor=#fefefe
| 141964 ||  || — || August 13, 2002 || Anderson Mesa || LONEOS || — || align=right | 1.2 km || 
|-id=965 bgcolor=#fefefe
| 141965 ||  || — || August 13, 2002 || Anderson Mesa || LONEOS || V || align=right | 1.0 km || 
|-id=966 bgcolor=#fefefe
| 141966 ||  || — || August 14, 2002 || Anderson Mesa || LONEOS || V || align=right | 1.3 km || 
|-id=967 bgcolor=#fefefe
| 141967 ||  || — || August 13, 2002 || Socorro || LINEAR || — || align=right | 1.6 km || 
|-id=968 bgcolor=#fefefe
| 141968 ||  || — || August 13, 2002 || Anderson Mesa || LONEOS || MAS || align=right | 1.4 km || 
|-id=969 bgcolor=#fefefe
| 141969 ||  || — || August 13, 2002 || Anderson Mesa || LONEOS || — || align=right | 3.5 km || 
|-id=970 bgcolor=#fefefe
| 141970 ||  || — || August 14, 2002 || Socorro || LINEAR || MAS || align=right | 1.1 km || 
|-id=971 bgcolor=#E9E9E9
| 141971 ||  || — || August 14, 2002 || Socorro || LINEAR || — || align=right | 1.6 km || 
|-id=972 bgcolor=#fefefe
| 141972 ||  || — || August 14, 2002 || Socorro || LINEAR || V || align=right | 1.5 km || 
|-id=973 bgcolor=#fefefe
| 141973 ||  || — || August 14, 2002 || Socorro || LINEAR || — || align=right | 1.7 km || 
|-id=974 bgcolor=#fefefe
| 141974 ||  || — || August 14, 2002 || Socorro || LINEAR || — || align=right | 1.7 km || 
|-id=975 bgcolor=#fefefe
| 141975 ||  || — || August 14, 2002 || Socorro || LINEAR || NYS || align=right | 1.1 km || 
|-id=976 bgcolor=#E9E9E9
| 141976 ||  || — || August 14, 2002 || Socorro || LINEAR || — || align=right | 2.2 km || 
|-id=977 bgcolor=#fefefe
| 141977 ||  || — || August 14, 2002 || Socorro || LINEAR || V || align=right | 1.2 km || 
|-id=978 bgcolor=#fefefe
| 141978 ||  || — || August 14, 2002 || Socorro || LINEAR || — || align=right | 4.9 km || 
|-id=979 bgcolor=#E9E9E9
| 141979 ||  || — || August 15, 2002 || Anderson Mesa || LONEOS || — || align=right | 1.7 km || 
|-id=980 bgcolor=#fefefe
| 141980 ||  || — || August 6, 2002 || Palomar || NEAT || NYS || align=right | 1.3 km || 
|-id=981 bgcolor=#E9E9E9
| 141981 ||  || — || August 15, 2002 || Socorro || LINEAR || — || align=right | 3.7 km || 
|-id=982 bgcolor=#fefefe
| 141982 ||  || — || August 13, 2002 || Socorro || LINEAR || — || align=right | 1.4 km || 
|-id=983 bgcolor=#fefefe
| 141983 ||  || — || August 14, 2002 || Socorro || LINEAR || — || align=right | 1.5 km || 
|-id=984 bgcolor=#fefefe
| 141984 ||  || — || August 14, 2002 || Socorro || LINEAR || — || align=right | 1.2 km || 
|-id=985 bgcolor=#fefefe
| 141985 ||  || — || August 14, 2002 || Socorro || LINEAR || NYS || align=right | 1.4 km || 
|-id=986 bgcolor=#fefefe
| 141986 ||  || — || August 15, 2002 || Anderson Mesa || LONEOS || NYS || align=right | 1.1 km || 
|-id=987 bgcolor=#fefefe
| 141987 ||  || — || August 11, 2002 || Socorro || LINEAR || FLO || align=right | 1.2 km || 
|-id=988 bgcolor=#FA8072
| 141988 ||  || — || August 12, 2002 || Socorro || LINEAR || — || align=right | 1.6 km || 
|-id=989 bgcolor=#fefefe
| 141989 ||  || — || August 12, 2002 || Socorro || LINEAR || — || align=right | 3.4 km || 
|-id=990 bgcolor=#E9E9E9
| 141990 ||  || — || August 12, 2002 || Socorro || LINEAR || BRG || align=right | 2.9 km || 
|-id=991 bgcolor=#fefefe
| 141991 ||  || — || August 12, 2002 || Haleakala || NEAT || — || align=right | 1.8 km || 
|-id=992 bgcolor=#fefefe
| 141992 ||  || — || August 13, 2002 || Bergisch Gladbach || W. Bickel || NYS || align=right | 1.4 km || 
|-id=993 bgcolor=#fefefe
| 141993 ||  || — || August 15, 2002 || Bergisch Gladbach || W. Bickel || MAS || align=right | 1.1 km || 
|-id=994 bgcolor=#fefefe
| 141994 ||  || — || August 8, 2002 || Palomar || NEAT || V || align=right | 1.1 km || 
|-id=995 bgcolor=#fefefe
| 141995 Rossbeyer ||  ||  || August 12, 2002 || Cerro Tololo || M. W. Buie || — || align=right | 1.2 km || 
|-id=996 bgcolor=#fefefe
| 141996 ||  || — || August 8, 2002 || Palomar || S. F. Hönig || MAS || align=right data-sort-value="0.95" | 950 m || 
|-id=997 bgcolor=#fefefe
| 141997 ||  || — || August 8, 2002 || Palomar || S. F. Hönig || — || align=right | 1.3 km || 
|-id=998 bgcolor=#fefefe
| 141998 ||  || — || August 8, 2002 || Palomar || S. F. Hönig || NYS || align=right | 1.3 km || 
|-id=999 bgcolor=#fefefe
| 141999 ||  || — || August 8, 2002 || Palomar || S. F. Hönig || V || align=right data-sort-value="0.94" | 940 m || 
|-id=000 bgcolor=#fefefe
| 142000 ||  || — || August 8, 2002 || Palomar || S. F. Hönig || V || align=right data-sort-value="0.92" | 920 m || 
|}

References

External links 
 Discovery Circumstances: Numbered Minor Planets (140001)–(145000) (IAU Minor Planet Center)

0141